This is an alphabetical list of internationally notable poets.

A

Ab–Ak
Aarudhra (1925–1968), Indian Telugu poet, born Bhagavatula Sadasiva Sankara Sastry
Jonathan Aaron (born 1941), US poet
Chris Abani (born 1966), Nigerian poet
Henry Abbey (1842–1911), US poet
Eleanor Hallowell Abbott (1872–1958), US poet and fiction writer
Siôn Abel (fl. 18th c.), Welsh balladeer
Lascelles Abercrombie (1881–1938), English poet and literary critic
Arthur Talmage Abernethy (1872–1956), US journalist, minister, scholar; first North Carolina Poet Laureate
Sam Abrams (born 1935), US poet, editor and critic
Seth Abramson (born 1976), US poet
Kosta Abrašević (1879–1898), Serbian poet
Dannie Abse (1923–2014), Welsh poet in English
Kathy Acker (1947–1997), US experimental novelist, punk poet and playwright
Diane Ackerman (born 1948), US author, poet and naturalist
Duane Ackerson (1942–2020), US writer of speculative poetry and fiction
Milton Acorn (1923–1986), Canadian poet, writer and playwright
Harold Acton (1904–1994), English writer, scholar and dilettante
János Aczél (died 1523), Hungarian poet and provost
Tamás Aczél (1921–1994), Hungarian poet
Gilbert Adair (1944–2011), Scottish novelist, poet and critic
Virginia Hamilton Adair (1919–2004), US poet
Helen Adam (1909–1993), Scottish-US poet, collagist and photographer
Draginja Adamović (1925–2000), Serbian poet
John Adams (1704–1740), US poet
Léonie Adams (1899–1988), US poet
Ryan Adams (born 1974), US singer-songwriter and writer
Hendrik Adamson (1891–1946), Estonian poet
Fleur Adcock (born 1934), New Zealand poet mainly in England
Joseph Addison (1672–1719), English essayist, poet, writer and politician
Kim Addonizio (born 1954) US poet and novelist
Artur Adson (1889–1977), Estonian poet
Endre Ady (1877–1919), Hungarian poet
Mariska Ady (1888–1977), Hungarian poet
Aeschylus (525–456 BCE), Athenian tragedian
Lucius Afranius (fl. c. 94 BCE), Roman comic poet
Anastasia Afanasieva (born 1982), Ukrainian physician, poet, writer, translator
John Agard (born 1949), Afro-Guyanese poet and children's writer
Patience Agbabi (born 1965), British poet and performer 
James Agee (1909–1955), US novelist, screenwriter and poet
Deborah Ager (born 1977), US poet and editor
István Ágh (born 1938), Hungarian poet
Kelli Russell Agodon (born 1969), US poet
Dritëro Agolli (1931–2017), Albanian poet
Carlos Martínez Aguirre (born 1974), Spanish poet
Delmira Agustini (1886–1914), Uruguayan poet
Ishaaq bin Ahmed (1095 – 12th century), Arab scholar, poet and ancestor of the Somali Isaaq clan-family
Ai (Florence Anthony, 1947–2010), US poet
Ama Ata Aidoo (born 1940), Ghanaian novelist, poet, playwright and academic
Conrad Aiken (1889–1973), US poet and author
Aganice Ainianos (1838–1892), Greek poet
Akazome Emon (956–1041), Japanese poet and historian
Mark Akenside (1721–1770), English poet and physician
Rachel Akerman (1522–1544), Austrian Jewish poet writing in German
Mehdi Akhavan-Sales (1929–1990), Iranian poet
Bella Akhmadulina (1937–2010), Russian poet
Anna Akhmatova (1889–1966), Russian poet
Jan Nisar Akhtar (1914–1976), Indian Urdu poet
Javed Akhtar (born 1945), Indian poet, lyricist and scriptwriter
Salman Akhtar (born 1946), Indian US professor and poet writing in English and Urdu

Al–Am
Amina Al Adwan (born 1935), Jordanian writer, poet and critic
Muhammad Taha Al-Qaddal (1951–2021), Sudanese poet
Luigi Alamanni (1495–1556), Italian poet and statesman
Alasdair mac Mhaighstir Alasdair (c. 1698–1770), Scottish Gaelic poet
Ave Alavainu (born 1942), Estonian poet
Gillebríghde Albanach (fl. 1200–1230), Scottish Gaelic poet and crusader
Alcaeus (4th c. BCE), Athenian comic poet in Greek
Alcaeus of Messene (fl. late 3rd/early 2nd c. BCE), Greek writer of verse epigrams
Alcaeus of Mytilene (7th–6th c. BCE), Greek lyric poet from Lesbos
Allamraju Subrahmanyakavi (1831–1892), Indian Telugu poet
Guru Amar Das (1479–1574), Punjabi poet and Sikh guru
Ammiel Alcalay (born 1956), US poet, scholar and critic
Alcman (fl. 7th c. BCE), Ancient Greek lyric poet
Amos Bronson Alcott (1799–1888), US poet and teacher
Richard Aldington (1892–1962), English poet and writer
Vasile Alecsandri (1821–1890), Romanian poet
Tudur Aled (c. 1465–1525), Welsh poet writing in Welsh
Claribel Alegría (1924–2018), Central US poet writing in Spanish
Vicente Aleixandre (1898–1984), Spanish poet, Nobel Laureate 1977
Josip Murn Aleksandrov (1879–1901), Slovene symbolist poet
Sherman Alexie (born 1966), US poet and writer
Felipe Alfau (1902–1999), Catalan US novelist and poet
Agha Shahid Ali (1949–2001) Indian, Kashmiri and US poet
Taha Muhammad Ali (1931–2011), Palestinian poet
Dante Alighieri (1265–1321), Italian poet
James Alexander Allan (1889–1956), Australian poet
August Alle (1899–1952), Estonian poet
William Allegrezza (born 1974), US poet, professor and editor
Dick Allen (1939–2017), US poet, critic and academic
Donald Allen (1912–2004), US poet, editor and translator
Elizabeth Akers Allen (1832–1911), US author and poet
Ron Allen (1947–2010), US poet and playwright
Artur Alliksaar (1923–1966), Estonian poet
William Allingham (1824 or 1828–1889), Irish poet and man of letters
Washington Allston (1779–1843), US painter and poet
Damaso Alonso (1898–1990), Spanish poet, philologist and critic
Alta (Alta Gerrey; born 1942), US poet and writer
Natan Alterman (1910–1970), Israeli poet, journalist and translator
Alurista (born 1947), Chicano poet and activist
Al Alvarez (fl. 1929–2019), English poet
Julia Alvarez (born 1950), Dominican-US poet, novelist and essayist
Betti Alver (1906–1989), Estonian poet
Moniza Alvi (born 1954), Pakistani-British poet and writer
Ambroise (fl. c. 1190), Norman-French poet of Third Crusade
Yehuda Amichai (1924–2000), Israeli poet
Indran Amirthanayagam (born 1960), Sri Lankan US poet, essayist and translator
Kingsley Amis (1922–1995), English author and poet
A. R. Ammons (1926–2001), US author and poet

An–Aq
Anacreon (570–488 BCE), Greek lyric poet
Alfred Andersch (1914–1980), German writer and publisher
Mir Anees or Anis) (1803–1874), Indian poet in Urdu
Guda Anjaiah (1955–2016), Telugu Indian poet, singer, lyricist and writer from Telangana
Ardan Angarkhaev (born 1946), Russian poet and writer
Temsüla Ao (born 1945), Indian Naga poet, short story writer, and ethnographer
Ana Paula Arendt (born 1980), Brazilian classical poet
Hans Christian Andersen (1805–1875), Danish poet and children's writer
Victor Henry Anderson (1917–2001), US poet, kahuna and teacher of the Feri Tradition
Carlos Drummond de Andrade (1902–1987), Brazilian poet
Mário de Andrade (1893–1945), Brazilian poet, novelist and critic
Bernard André (1450–1522), French Augustinian poet: poet laureate to Henry VII of England
Peter Andrej (born 1959), Slovenian poet and musician
Sophia de Mello Breyner Andresen (1919–2004), Portuguese poet and writer
Bruce Andrews (born 1948), US poet of language
Kevin Andrews (1924–1989), Anglo-Greek philhellene writer and archeologist
Ron Androla (born 1954), US poet
Guru Angad (1504–1552), Sikh Guru and Punjabi poet
Aneirin (fl. 6th c.), Brythonic epic poet
Ralph Angel (1951–2020), US poet and translator
Maya Angelou (1928–2014), US poet
James Stout Angus (1830–1923), Shetland poet mainly in Shetland dialect
Marion Angus (1865–1946), Scottish poet in Scots
J. K. Annand (1908–1993), Scottish children's poet
Mika Antić (1932–1986), Serbian poet
David Antin (1932–2016), US poet and critic
Antler (born 1946), US poet
Susanne Antonetta (born 1956), US poet and author
Brother Antoninus (1912–1994), US poet
Raymond Antrobus (living), British
Chairil Anwar (1922–1949), Indonesian poet
Johannes Anyuru (born 1979), Swedish poet
Guillaume Apollinaire (1880–1918), French poet
Apollonius of Rhodes (270 – post–245 BCE), Greek poet and librarian in Alexandria
Maja Apostoloska (born 1976), Macedonian poet
Philip Appleman (1926–2020), US poet and professor
Lajos Áprily (1887–1967), Hungarian poet and translator
Pawlu Aquilina (1929–2009), Maltese poet

Ar
Louis Aragon (1897–1982), French poet, novelist and editor
János Arany (1817–1882), Hungarian poet
Archilochus (c. 680 – c. 645 BCE), Greek lyric poet
Walter Conrad Arensberg (1878–1954), US dadaist, critic and poet
Tudor Arghezi (1880–1967), Romanian poet
Ludovico Ariosto (1474–1533), Italian poet
Aristophanes (c. 446 – c. 386 BCE), Greek dramatic poet
Guru Arjan (1563–1606), Sikh guru and Punjabi poet
Rae Armantrout (born 1947), US language poet
Simon Armitage (born 1963), English poet, playwright and novelist
Richard Armour (1906–1989), US poet and author
Ernst Moritz Arndt (1769–1860), German author and poet
Bettina von Arnim (1785–1859), German writer, composer and visual artist
Ludwig Achim von Arnim (1781–1831), German poet and novelist
Craig Arnold (1967–2009), US poet and professor
Matthew Arnold (1822–1888), English poet and cultural critic
Arnórr Þórðarson jarlaskáld (Poet of Earls, c. 1012 – 1070s), Icelandic skald
Jean Arp (1886–1966), German-French sculptor, painter and poet
Franciszka Arnsztajnowa (1865–1942), Polish poet
Antonin Artaud (1896–1948), French playwright, poet and essayist

As–Az

M. K. Asante (born 1982), US author, poet and professor
John Ashbery (1927–2017), US poet, 1976 Pulitzer Prize for Poetry
Cliff Ashby (1919–2012), English poet and novelist
Renée Ashley, US poet and novelist
Anton Aškerc (1856–1912), Slovenian poet and Roman Catholic priest
Adam Asnyk (1838–1897), Polish poet and dramatist
Herbert Asquith (1881–1947), English poet
Mina Assadi (born 1942), Iranian poet, author and songwriter
Vishnu Raj Atreya (1944–2020), Nepali poet, author, songwriter and novelist
Margaret Atwood (born 1939), Canadian poet, novelist and essayist
W. H. Auden (1907–1973), Anglo-US poet, essayist
Imre Augustich (Imre Augustič, 1837–1879), Slovenian/Hungarian poet
Joseph Auslander (1897–1965), US poet, anthologist and novelist; US Poet Laureate, 1937–1941
Ausonius (c. 310–395), Latin poet and rhetorician at Burdigala (Bordeaux)
Paul Auster (born 1947), US poet, playwright and essayist
James Avery (1948–2013), US actor, poet and screenwriter
Margaret Avison (1918–2007), Canadian poet
Krayem Awad (born 1948), Viennese painter, sculptor and poet of Syrian origin
Gennady Aygi (1934–2006), Russian poet
Ayo Ayoola-Amale (born 1970), Nigerian poet
Pam Ayres (born 1947), English humorous poet
Robert Aytoun (1570–1638), Scottish poet
Maryam Jafari Azarmani (born 1977), Iranian poet, essayist, critic and translator
Jody Azzouni (born 1954), US philosopher and poet

B

Ba
Mihály Babits (1883–1941), Hungarian poet and translator
Ken Babstock (born 1970), Canadian poet
Jimmy Santiago Baca (born 1952), US poet and writer of Apache/Chicano descent
Bacchylides (fl. 5th c. BCE), Greek lyric poet
Bellamy Bach (fl. 1980s), joint pseudonym of fiction writers and poets
Harivansh Rai Bachchan (fl. 20th c.), Hindi poet
Joseph M. Bachelor (also Joseph Morris, 1889–1947), US author, poet and educator
Simon Bacher (1823–1991), Hebrew poet in Hungary
Ingeborg Bachmann (1926–1973), Austrian poet and author
Sutardji Calzoum Bachri (born 1941), Indonesian poet
George Bacovia (1881–1957), Romanian poet
Krzysztof Kamil Baczyński (1921–1944), Polish poet and soldier
Julio Baghy (1891–1967), Hungarian Esperanto author and poet
Bai Juyi (772–846), Chinese poet of Tang dynasty
Joanna Baillie (1762–1851), Scottish poet and dramatist
József Bajza (1804–1858), Hungarian poet and critic
Józef Baka (1706/1707–1788), Polish/Lithuanian poet and Jesuit priest
Vyt Bakaitis (born 1940), Lithuania-US translator, editor and poet
David Baker (born 1954), US poet
Hinemoana Baker (born 1968) New Zealand poet and musician
Bâkî (1526–1600), Ottoman-Turkish language poet (pseudonym of Mahmud Abdülbâkî)
John Balaban (born 1943), US poet and translator
Bálint Balassi (1554–1594), Hungarian poet
Béla Balázs (1884–1949), Hungarian poet and critic
Edward Balcerzan (born 1937), Polish poet, critic and translator
Stanisław Baliński (1898–1984), Polish poet and diplomat
Jesse Ball (born 1978), US poet and novelist
Zsófia Balla (born 1949), Hungarian poet from Romania
Addie L. Ballou (1837–1916), US poet and suffragist
Konstantin Balmont (1867–1942), Russian symbolist poet and translator
Russell Banks (born 1940), US fiction writer and poet
Anne Bannerman (1765–1829), Scottish poet
Amiri Baraka (aka Leroi Jones) (1934–2014), US writer, poet and dramatist
Marcin Baran (born 1963), Polish poet and journalist
Stanisław Barańczak (1946–2014), Polish poet, critic and translator
Anna Laetitia Barbauld (1743–1825), English poet, essayist and children's author
Porfirio Barba-Jacob (1883–1942), Colombian poet and writer
John Barbour (c. 1320–1395), Scottish poet, first major writer in Scottish English
Alexander Barclay (c. 1476–1552), English/Scottish poet
George Barker (1913–1991), English poet and author
Les Barker (born 1947), English poet
Coleman Barks (born 1937), US poet
Christine Barkhuizen le Roux (1959–2020), South African poet
Mihály Barla (Miháo Barla, c. 1778–1824), Slovenian poet and pastor in Hungary
Mary Barnard (1909–2001), US poet, biographer and translator
Djuna Barnes (1892–1982), US writer
William Barnes (1801–1886), English writer, poet and philologist
Catherine Barnett (born 1960), US poet and educator
Richard Barnfield (1574–1620), English poet
Willis Barnstone (born 1927), US poet and literary translator
Maria Barrell (died 1803), poet, playwright and writer of periodicals
Laird Barron (born 1970), US poet, author
Sándor Barta (1897–1938), Hungarian poet executed in USSR
Bernard Barton (1784–1849), English poet and Quaker
Bertha Hirsch Baruch (fl. late 18th – early 19th c.), US writer, poet and suffragist
Todd Bash (born 1965), US avant-garde playwright, poet and writer
Matsuo Bashō (1644–1694), Japanese renku and haiku poet
Michael Basinski (born 1950), US text, visual and sound poet
Ellen Bass (born 1947), US poet
Arlo Bates (1850–1918), US author, poet and educator
David Bates (1809–1870), US poet
Joseph Bathanti (born 1953), US poet, writer and professor; North Carolina Poet Laureate
János Batsányi (1763–1845), Hungarian poet
Dawn-Michelle Baude (born 1959), US poet, journalist and educator
Charles Baudelaire (1821–1867), French poet, essayist and translator
Cirilo Bautista (1941–2018), Philippines poet, writer and critic
Charles Baxter (born 1947), US writer and poet
James K. Baxter (1926–1972), New Zealand poet

Be
Jan Beatty (born 1952), US poet
Francis Beaumont (1584–1616), English poet and dramatist
Samuel Beckett (1906–1989), Irish avant-garde playwright, novelist and poet
Joshua Beckman (living), US poet
Matija Bećković (born 1939), Serbian writer and poet
Gustavo Adolfo Bécquer (1836–1870), Spanish poet and fiction writer
Thomas Lovell Beddoes (1803–1849), English poet, dramatist and physician
Patricia Beer (1919–1999), English poet and critic
Sapargali Begalin (1895–1983), Kazakh poet
Aphra Behn (1640–1689), English Restoration dramatist; early professional female writer
Ferenc Békássy (1893–1915), Hungarian poet
Erin Belieu (born 1967), US poet
Marvin Bell (1937–2020), US poet and teacher; first Poet Laureate of State of Iowa
Gioconda Belli (born 1948), Nicaraguan poet and novelist
Giuseppe Gioachino Belli (1791–1863), Italian sonneteer in Romanesco
Xuan Bello (born 1965), Asturian poet
Hilaire Belloc (1870–1953), Anglo-French writer and historian
Andrei Bely (1880–1934), Russian novelist, poet and critic
Stephen Vincent Benét (1898–1943), US author, poet and fiction writer
William Rose Benét (1886–1950), US poet, writer and editor
Elizabeth Benger (1775–1827), English poet, biographer and novelist
Gottfried Benn (1886–1956), German essayist, novelist and expressionist poet
Gwendolyn B. Bennett (1902–1981), African-US writer and poet
Jim Bennett (born 1951), English poet in Liverpool punk era
Richard Berengarten (born 1943) English poet, writer and translator
Bo Bergman (1869–1967), Swedish writer and critic
İlhan Berk (1918–2008), Turkish poet
Charles Bernstein (born 1950), US poet and scholar
Béroul (12th c.), Norman poet of episodic Tristan
Daniel Berrigan (1921–2016), US poet, priest and peace activist
Ted Berrigan (1934–1983), US poet
James Berry (1924–2017), Jamaican poet based in England
Wendell Berry (born 1934), US man of letters, critic and farmer
John Berryman (1914–1972), US poet and scholar
Dániel Berzsenyi (1776–1836), Hungarian poet
Mary Ursula Bethell (1874–1945), New Zealand poet and social worker
John Betjeman (1906–1984), English poet, writer and broadcaster
Elizabeth Beverley (fl. 1815–1830), English poet, writer and entertainer
Helen Bevington (1906–2001), US poet, prose writer and educator
L. S. Bevington (1845–1895), English anarchist poet and essayist

Bh–Bl

Subramanya Bharathi (1882–1921), Tamil writer, poet and Indian independence activist
Sujata Bhatt (born 1956), Indian poet in Gujarati
Źmitrok Biadula (1886–1941), Jewish Belarusian poet, prose writer and independence activist
Miron Białoszewski (1922–1983), Polish poet, novelist and playwright
Zbigniew Bieńkowski (1913–1994), Polish poet, critic and translator
Biernat of Lublin (c. 1465 – post-1529), Polish poet and fabulist
Laurence Binyon (1879–1943), English poet, dramatist and art scholar
Earle Birney (1904–1995), Canadian poet, fiction writer and dramatist
Nevin Birsa (1947–2003), Slovene poet
Balázs Birtalan (1969–2016), Hungarian poet and publicist
Elizabeth Bishop (1911–1979), US poet and short-story writer; US Poet Laureate
Ram Prasad Bismil (1897–1927), poet and revolutionary writing in Urdu and Hindi
Bill Bissett (born 1939), Canadian anti-conventional poet
Sherwin Bitsui (born 1975), US Navajo poet
Paul Blackburn (1926–1971) US poet
Richard Palmer Blackmur (1904–1965), US literary critic and poet
Lucian Blaga (1895–1961), Romanian philosopher, poet and playwright
Lewis Blake (born 1946), English poet 
William Blake (1757–1827), English painter, poet and printmaker
Don Blanding (1894–1957), US poet, journalist, writer and speaker
Adrian Blevins (born 1964), US poet
Mathilde Blind (1841–1896), German-born English poet and writer
Alexander Blok (1880–1921), Russian lyrical poet
Benjamin Paul Blood (1832–1919), US philosopher and poet
Robert Bloomfield (1766–1823), English laboring-class poet
Roy Blumenthal (born 1968), South African poet
Edmund Blunden (1896–1974), English poet, author and literary critic
Wilfrid Scawen Blunt (1840–1922), English poet and writer
Robert Bly (1926–2021), US poet, author and leader of mythopoetic men's movement

Bo–Bri
Johannes Bobrowski (1917–1965), East German author and poet
Giovanni Boccaccio (1313–1375), Italian author and poet
Jean Bodel (1165–1210), Old French poet
Ádám Bodor (born 1936), Hungarian poet from Romania
Louise Bogan (1897–1970), US poet; fourth US Poet Laureate
Matteo Maria Boiardo (1440/1441–1494), Italian Renaissance poet
Nicolas Boileau-Despréaux (1636–1711), French poet and critic
Michelle Boisseau (1955–2017), US poet
Christian Bök (born 1966), experimental Canadian poet
Osbern Bokenam (c. 1393 – c. 1464), English poet and friar
Eavan Boland (1944–2020), Irish poet
Alan Bold (1943–1998), Scottish poet, biographer and journalist
Heinrich Böll (1917–1985), German novelist
Edmund Bolton (c. 1575 – c. 1633), English historian and poet
Nozawa Bonchō (c. 1640–1714), Japanese haikai poet
Dietrich Bonhoeffer (1906–1945), German poet and Lutheran theologian
Arna Wendell Bontemps (1902–1973), US poet and member of the Harlem Renaissance
Luke Booker (1762–1835), English poet, cleric and antiquary
Kurt Boone (born 1959), US poet
Jorge Luis Borges (1899–1986), Argentine fiction writer, essayist and poet
Tadeusz Borowski (1922–1951), Polish writer and journalist
Hristo Botev (1848–1876), Bulgarian poet and revolutionary
Gordon Bottomley (1874–1948), English poet and verse dramatist
David Bottoms (born 1949), US poet; Georgia Poet Laureate
Cathy Smith Bowers (born 1949), US poet; North Carolina Poet Laureate 2010–2012
Edgar Bowers (1924–2000), US poet and Bollingen Prize in Poetry winner
Tadeusz Boy-Żeleński (1874–1941), Polish poet, critic and translator
Mark Alexander Boyd (1562–1601), Scottish poet and mercenary
Kay Boyle (1902–1992), US writer, educator and political activist
Alison Brackenbury (born 1953), English poet
Anne (Dudley) Bradstreet (c. 1612 – 1672) America's first published poet
Di Brandt (born 1952), Canadian poet and literary critic
Giannina Braschi (born 1953), US poet born in Puerto Rico
Kamau Brathwaite (1930–2020), Barbadian writer
Richard Brautigan (1935–1984), US fiction writer and poet
Bertolt Brecht (1898–1956), German playwright, poet and lyricist
Gerbrand Adriaensz Bredero (1585–1618), Dutch poet and playwright
Radovan Brenkus (born 1974), Slovak writer and poet
Christopher Brennan (1870–1932), Australian poet and scholar
Joseph Payne Brennan (1918–1990), US poet and writer of fantasy and horror fiction
Clemens Brentano (1778–1842), German poet and novelist
André Breton (1896–1966), French writer, poet and founder of Surrealism
Nicholas Breton (1545–1626), English poet and novelist
Ken Brewer (1941–2006), US poet and scholar; Utah Poet Laureate
Breyten Breytenbach (born 1939), South-African/French writer, poet and painter
Robert Bridges (1844–1930), English poet; Poet Laureate of the United Kingdom
Robert Bringhurst (born 1946), Canadian poet, typographer and author

Bro–By
Geoffrey Brock (born 1964), US poet and translator
Eve Brodlique (1867–1949), British-born Canadian/American poet, author and journalist
Joseph Brodsky (1940–1996), Russian poet and essayist
Wladyslaw Broniewski (1897–1962), Polish poet and soldier
William Bronk (1918–1999), US poet
Anne Brontë (1820–1849), English novelist and poet, youngest of three Brontë sisters
Charlotte Brontë (1816–1855), English novelist and poet, eldest of three Brontë sisters
Emily Brontë (1818–1848), English novelist and poet
Rupert Brooke (1887–1915), English poet
Gwendolyn Brooks (1917–2000), African-US poet; US Poet Laureate
Hans Adolph Brorson (1694–1764), Danish poet and Pietist bishop
Joan Brossa (1919–1998), Catalan poet, playwright and artist
Nicole Brossard (born 1943), French Canadian formalist poet and novelist
Olga Broumas (born 1949), Greek poet in United States
Flora Brovina (born 1949), Kosovar Albanian poet, pediatrician and women's rights activist
Petrus Brovka (aka Pyotr Ustinovich Brovka) (1905–1980), Soviet Belarusian poet
George Mackay Brown (1921–1996), Scottish poet, author and dramatist
James Brown known as J. B. Selkirk (1832–1904), Scottish poet and essayist
Sterling Brown (1901–1989), African-US academic writer and poet
Thomas Edward Brown (1830–1897), Manx poet, scholar and theologian
Frances Browne (1816–1887), Irish poet and novelist
William Browne (1590–1643), English poet
Elizabeth Barrett Browning (1806–1861), English poet
Robert Browning (1812–1889), English poet and playwright
William Cullen Bryant (1794–1878), US romantic poet and journalist
Colette Bryce (born 1970), Northern Irish poet
Bryher (aka Annie Winifred Ellerman) (1894–1983), English novelist, poet and memoirist
Valeri Bryusov (1873–1924), Russian poet, novelist and critic
Jan Brzechwa (1898–1966), Polish poet and children's writer
Dugald Buchanan (Dùghall Bochanan) (1716–1768), Scottish poet in Scots and Scottish Gaelic
Robert Williams Buchanan (1841–1901), Scottish poet, novelist and dramatist
Georg Büchner (1813–1837), German writer, poet and dramatist
August Buchner (1591–1661), German Baroque poet and professor
Vincent Buckley (1927–1988), Australian poet, essayist and critic
David Budbill (1940–2016), US poet and playwright
Andrea Hollander Budy (born 1947), US poet
Teodor Bujnicki (1907–1944), Polish poet
Charles Bukowski (1920–1994), US poet, novelist and short story writer
Ivan Bunin (1870–1953) Russian poet and novelist
Basil Bunting (1900–1985), English modernist poet
Anthony Burgess (1917–1993), English writer, poet and playwright
Robert Burns (1759–1796), Scottish poet and a lyricist
Stanley Burnshaw (1906–2005), US poet
John Burnside (born 1955), Scottish poet and writer, winner of T. S. Eliot and Forward poetry prizes
William S. Burroughs (1914–1997), US novelist, poet and essayist
Andrzej Bursa (1932–1957), Polish poet and writer
Yosa Buson (1716–1783), Japanese haikai poet and painter
Raegan Butcher (born 1969), US poet and singer
Ray Buttigieg (born 1955), poet, composer and musician
Ignazio Buttitta (1899–1997), Sicilian language poet
Anthony Butts (born 1969), US poet
Kathryn Stripling Byer (1944–2017), US poet and teacher; North Carolina Poet Laureate 2005–09
Witter Bynner (also Emanuel Morgan, 1881–1968), US poet, writer and scholar
George Gordon Byron, Lord Byron (1788–1824), English poet and literary figure

C

Cab–Cav

Lydia Cabrera (1899–1991), Cuban anthropologist and poet
Dilys Cadwaladr (1902–1979), Welsh poet and fiction writer in Welsh
Cædmon (fl. 7th c.), earliest Northumbrian poet known by name
Maoilios Caimbeul (born 1944), Scots poet and children's writer in Gaelic
Scott Cairns (born 1954), US poet, memoirist and essayist
Alison Calder, Canadian poet and educator
Angus Calder (1942–2008), Scots poet, academic and educator
Pedro Calderón de la Barca y Barreda González de Henao Ruiz de Blasco y Riaño (1600–1681), Spanish dramatist, poet and writer of Spanish Golden Age
Musa Cälil (1906–1944), Soviet Tatar poet
Barry Callaghan (born 1937), Canadian author, poet and anthologist
Michael Feeney Callan (born 1955), Irish poet, novelist and biographer
Callimachus (c. 305 – c. 240 BCE), Hellenistic poet, critic and scholar at Library of Alexandria
Robert Calvert (1944–1988), South African writer, poet and musician
Norman Cameron (1905–1953), Scottish poet
Luís de Camões (c. 1524–1580), early Portuguese poet
Angus Peter Campbell (aka Aonghas P(h)àdraig Caimbeul, born 1952), Scottish poet, novelist, broadcaster and actor
David Campbell (1915–1979), Australian poet and wartime pilot
Roy Campbell (1901–1957), South African poet and satirist
Thomas Campbell (1777–1844), Scottish poet
Jan Campert (1902–1943), Dutch poet and journalist
Remco Campert (1929–2022), Dutch poet and novelist
Thomas Campion (1567–1619), English composer, poet and physician
Matilde Camus (1919–2012), Spanish poet and researcher
Melville Henry Cane (1879–1980), US poet and lawyer
Ivan Cankar (1876–1918), Slovene playwright, essayist and poet
May Wedderburn Cannan (1893–1973), English poet
Edip Cansever (1928–1986), Turkish poet
Cao Cao (155–220), Chinese poet and warlord
Cao Pi (formally Emperor Wen of Wei) (187–226), Chinese poet and first emperor of state of Cao Wei; second son of Cao Cao
Cao Zhi (192–232), Chinese poet; third son of Cao Cao
Vahni Capildeo (born 1973), Trinidadian poet
Ernesto Cardenal (1925–2020), Nicaraguan Roman Catholic poet and priest
Giosuè Carducci (1835–1907), Italian poet and teacher
Thomas Carew (1595–1639), English Cavalier poet
Henry Carey (1687–1743), English poet, dramatist and songwriter
Robert Carliell (died c. 1622), English didactic poet
Bliss Carman (1861–1929), Canadian-US poet associated with Confederation Poets
Fern G. Z. Carr (born 1956), Canadian poet, translator, teacher and lawyer
Jim Carroll (1949–2009), US author, poet and punk musician
Lewis Carroll (born Charles Lutwidge Dodgson) (1832–1898), English writer, mathematician and photographer
Hayden Carruth (1921–2008), US poet and literary critic
Ann Elizabeth Carson (born 1929), Canadian poet, artist and feminist
Anne Carson (born 1950), Canadian poet, essayist and translator
Elizabeth Carter (1717–1806), English poet and bluestocking
Jared Carter (born 1939), US poet and editor
William Cartwright (1611–1643), English dramatist and churchman
Neal Cassady (1926–1968), figure in 1950s Beat Generation and 1960s psychedelic movement
Cyrus Cassells (born 1957), US poet and professor
Rosalía de Castro (1837–1885), Galician poet
Catullus (c. 84–54 BCE), Latin poet under the Roman Republic
Charles Causley (1917–2003), Cornish poet, schoolmaster and writer
C. P. Cavafy (1863–1933), Greek poet, journalist and civil servant
Guido Cavalcanti (1250s – 1300), Florentine poet and friend of Dante Alighieri
Nick Cave (born 1957), Australian writer, musician and actor
Margaret Cavendish, Duchess of Newcastle-upon-Tyne (1623–1673), English writer, aristocrat and scientist

Ce–Cl
Paul Celan (1920–1970), Romanian-born Jewish poet and translator
Thomas Centolella (living), US poet
Blaise Cendrars (1887–1961), French poet and author
Anica Černej (1900–1944), Slovene author and poet
Luis Cernuda (1903–1963), Spanish poet and literary critic
Aimé Césaire (1913–2008), French poet, author and politician from Martinique
Mário Cesariny de Vasconcelos (1923–2006), Portuguese surrealist poet
Úrsula Céspedes (1832–1874), Cuban poet
Ashok Chakradhar (born 1951), Hindi author and poet
John Chalkhill (fl. 1600), English poet
Jean Chapelain (1595–1674), French poet and critic
Arthur Chapman (1873–1935), US cowboy poet and columnist
George Chapman (1559–1634), English dramatist, translator and poet
Fred Chappell (born 1936), US author and poet; North Carolina Poet Laureate 1997–2002
René Char (1907–1998), French poet
Charles, Duke of Orléans (1394–1465), poet
Craig Charles (born 1964), English writer, poet and comedian
Thomas Chatterton (1752–1770), English poet and forger of medieval poetry
Geoffrey Chaucer (c. 1343–1400), poet, philosopher and alchemist
Subhadra Kumari Chauhan (1904–1948), Indian poet writing in Hindi
Reverend Fr. Fray Angelico Chavez (1910–1996), US writer, poet and Franciscan priest
Susana Chávez (1974–2011), Mexican poet and human rights activist
Syl Cheney-Coker (born 1945), Sierra Leone poet and novelist
Andrea Cheng (1957–2015), Hungarian-US poet and children's author
Kelly Cherry (born 1940), US author and poet; Poet Laureate of Virginia 2010–2012
G. K. Chesterton (1874–1936), English writer and poet
Choe Chiwon (born 857), Korean (Silla) poet
Fukuda Chiyo-ni (1703–1775), female Japanese haiku poet of Edo period
Henri Chopin (1922–2008), avant-garde poet and musician
Jean Chopinel (or Jean de Meun) (c. 1240 – c. 1305), French writer
Chrétien de Troyes (fl. 12th c.), French poet
Ralph Chubb (1892–1960), poet, painter and printer
Charles Churchill (1732–1764), English poet and satirist
John Ciardi (1916–1986) Italian-US poet, translator and etymologist
Colley Cibber (1671–1757), English playwright and Poet Laureate
Jovan Ćirilov (1931–2014), Serbian drama expert, writer and poet
Carson Cistulli (born 1979), US poet, essayist and English professor
Hélène Cixous (born 1937), French feminist writer, poet and playwright
Amy Clampitt (1920–1994), US poet and author
Kate Clanchy (born 1965), Scottish poet and writer
John Clanvowe (c. 1341–1391), Anglo-Welsh poet and diplomat
John Clare (1793–1864), English poet
Elizabeth Clark (1918–1978), Scottish poet and playwright
Austin Clarke (1896–1974), Irish poet
George Elliott Clarke (born 1960), Canadian poet and academic
Gillian Clarke (born 1937), Welsh poet and playwright in English
Paul Claudel (1868–1955), French poet, dramatist and diplomat
Claudian (c. 370–404), Latin poet at court of Emperor Honorius
Matthias Claudius (Asmus, 1740–1815), German poet
Hugo Claus (1929–2008), Belgian author, poet and film director
Brian P. Cleary (born 1959), US humorist, poet and author
Jack Clemo (1916–1994), English Christian poet
Michelle Cliff (1946–2016), Jamaican-US author of fiction, prose poems and literary criticism
Lucille Clifton (1936–2010), educator and Poet Laureate of Maryland
Arthur Hugh Clough (1819–1861), English poet, educationalist and assistant to Florence Nightingale

Coa–Con
Grace Stone Coates (1881–1976), US poet and story writer
Robbie Coburn (born 1994), Australian poet
Alison Cockburn (1712–1794), Scottish poet, wit and socialite
Jean Cocteau (1889–1963), French writer
Judith Ortiz Cofer (1952–2016), Puerto Rican poet and author
Leonard Cohen (1934–2016), Canadian singer-songwriter, poet and novelist
Wanda Coleman (1946–2013), African-US poet
Hartley Coleridge (1796–1849), English poet, biographer and essayist
Mary Elizabeth Coleridge (1861–1907), English novelist, essayist and poet
Samuel Taylor Coleridge (1772–1834), English poet
Edward Coletti (born 1944), Italian-US poet
Billy Collins (born 1941), US poet; US Poet Laureate 2001–2003
William Collins (1721–1759), English poet
William Congreve (1670–1729), English playwright and poet
Stewart Conn (born 1936), Scottish poet and playwright
Paul Conneally (born 1959), English poet, artist and musician
Robert Conquest (1917–2015), Anglo-US historian and poet
Henry Constable (1562–1613), English poet
David Constantine (born 1944), English poet and translator

Coo–Cz
Clark Coolidge (born 1939), US poet
Wendy Cope (born 1945), English poet
Robert Copland (fl. 1508–1547), English printer, author and translator
Julia Copus (born 1969), English poet and biographer
Denys Corbet (1826–1909), Guernsey poet in Guernésiais
Tristan Corbière (1845–1875), French poet
Cid Corman (1924–2004), US poet, translator and editor
Alfred Corn (born 1943), US poet and essayist
Frances Cornford (1886–1960), English poet
F. M. Cornford (1874–1943), English classical scholar and poet; husband of Frances Cornford
Joe Corrie (1894–1968), Scottish miner, poet and playwright
Gregory Corso (1930–2001), US Beat poet
Jayne Cortez (1936–2012), US poet and performance artist
George Coșbuc (1866–1918), Romanian poet, translator and teacher
Charles Cotton (1630–1687), English poet, author and translator
Abraham Cowley (1618–1667), English poet
Malcolm Cowley (1898–1989), US novelist, poet and critic
William Cowper (1731–1800), English poet and hymnist
George Crabbe (1754–1832), English poet, naturalist and clergyman
Hart Crane (1899–1932), US modernist poet
Stephen Crane (1871–1900), US novelist, short story writer and poet
Richard Crashaw (1613–1649), English Metaphysical poet
Robert Creeley (1926–2005), US poet
Octave Crémazie (1827–1879), French Canadian poet
Ann Batten Cristall (1769–1848), English poet
Charles Cros (1842–1888), French poet and inventor
Aleister Crowley (1875–1947), English occultist and poet
Andrew Crozier (1943–2008), English poet
György Csanády (1895–1952), Hungarian poet and journalist
Sándor Csoóri (1930–2016), Hungarian poet, essayist and politician
Cui Hao (c. 704–754), Tang Dynasty Chinese poet
Countee Cullen (1903–1946), US poet
Necati Cumalı (1921–2001), Turkish writer of fiction writer, essayist and poet
E. E. Cummings (1894–1962), US poet, essayist and playwright
Allan Cunningham (1784–1842), Scottish poet and author
James Vincent Cunningham (1911–1985), US poet, literary critic and teacher
Allen Curnow (1911–2001), New Zealand poet and journalist
Ivor Cutler (1923–2006), Scottish poet, songwriter and humorist
Józef Czechowicz (1903–1939), Polish poet
Gergely Czuczor (1800–1866), Hungarian poet, monk and academic
Tytus Czyżewski (1880–1945), Polish poet, playwright and painter

D

Da–Dh
Dalpatram (Dalpatram Dahyabhai Travadi) (1820–1898), Indian Gujarati language poet
Roque Dalton (1935–1975), Salvador poet
Sapardi Djoko Damono (1940–2020), Indonesian poet
Samuel Daniel (1562–1619), English poet and historian
David Daniels (1933–2008), US visual poet
Jeffrey Daniels (living), African-US poet
Thomas d'Angleterre, 12th-century poet in Old French
Gabriele D'Annunzio (1863–1938), Italian poet, journalist, novelist and dramatist
Hugh Antoine d'Arcy (1843–1925), French-born poet and writer
Rubén Darío (1867–1916), Nicaraguan poet initiating modernismo
Keki Daruwalla (born 1937), Indian poet and fiction writer in English
Erasmus Darwin (1731–1802), English poet and herbalist
Mahmoud Darwish (1941–2008), Palestinian poet and author
Elizabeth Daryush (1887–1977), English poet; daughter of Robert Bridges
Jibanananda Das (1899–1954), Bengali poet and author
Petter Dass (died 1707), Norwegian poet
Mina Dastgheib (born 1943), Iranian poet
René Daumal (1908–1944), French para-surrealist writer and poet
Jean Daurat (1508–1588), French poet, scholar and La Pléiade member 
William Davenant (1606–1668), English poet and playwright
Guy Davenport (1927–2005), US writer, translator and illustrator
Donald Davidson (1893–1968) US poet, essayist and critic
John Davidson (1857–1909), Scottish balladeer, playwright and novelist
Lucretia Maria Davidson (1808–1825), US poet
Donald Davie (1922–1995), English poet and critic
Alan Davies (born 1951), US poet, critic and editor
Hugh Sykes Davies (1909–1984), English poet, novelist and communist
Sir John Davies (1569–1626), English poet, lawyer and politician
W. H. Davies (1871–1940), Welsh poet and writer
Jon Davis, US poet
Edward Davison (1898–1970), Scottish-US poet and critic; father of poet Peter Davison
Peter Davison (1928–2004), US poet, essayist and editor; son of poet Edward Davison
Denis Davydov (1784–1839), Russian soldier-poet of Napoleonic Wars
Dayaram (1777–1853), Gujarati language poet
Gábor Dayka (1769–1796), Hungarian poet
Cecil Day-Lewis (1904–1972), Anglo-Irish poet; UK Poet Laureate 1968–1972
James Deahl (born 1945), Canadian poet and publisher
Dulcie Deamer (1890–1972), Australian poet and novelist
John F. Deane (born 1943), Irish poet and novelist
Aleš Debeljak (1961–2016), Slovenian critic, poet and essayist
Jean Louis De Esque (1879–1956), US poet and author
Madeline DeFrees (1919–2015), US poet
Jacek Dehnel (born 1980), Polish poet, translator and painter
Thomas Dekker (1572–1641), English Elizabethan dramatist and pamphleteer
Sor Juana Inés de la Cruz (1651–1695), Mexican poet
Baltasar del Alcázar (1530–1606), Spanish poet
Walter de la Mare (1873–1956), English poet, short story writer and novelist
Leconte de Lisle (1818–1894), French poet of Parnassian movement
Christine De Luca (born 1947), Scottish poet in English and Shetland dialect
François de Malherbe (1555–1628), French poet, critic and translator
Alfred de Musset (1810–1857), French poet
Gérard de Nerval (1808–1855), French poet, essayist and translator
Sir John Denham (c. 1614–1669), English poet and courtier
Tory Dent (1958–2005), US poet, critic and commentator
Évariste de Parny (1753–1814), French poet
Regina Derieva (1949–2013), Russian poet and writer
Johan Andreas Dèr Mouw (1863–1919), Dutch poet and philosopher
Toi Derricotte (born 1941), African-US poet
Eustache Deschamps (1346–1406), medieval French poet
Lord de Tabley (1835–1895), poet and botanist
Babette Deutsch (1895–1982), US poet, critic and novelist
Félix Lope de Vega y Carpio (1562–1635), Spanish playwright and poet
Edward de Vere, 17th Earl of Oxford, courtier and poet praised also for lost plays
Alfred de Vigny (1797–1863), French poet, playwright and novelist
Lakshmi Prasad Devkota (1909–1959), Nepali poet and essayist
Phillippa Yaa de Villiers (born 1966), South African poet and performance artist
Imtiaz Dharker (born 1954), Pakistan-born British poet, artist and filmmaker
Dhurjati (c. 15th – 16th cc.), Telugu language poet

Di–Dr
Souéloum Diagho (living), Tuareg poet
Pier Giorgio Di Cicco (1949–2019), Italian-Canadian poet; Poet Laureate of Toronto
Jennifer K Dick (born 1970), US poet
James Dickey (1923–1997), US poet and novelist; Poet Laureate Consultant in Poetry to Library of Congress
Emily Dickinson (1830–1886), US poet
Matthew Dickman (born 1975), US poet, twin of Michael Dickman
Michael Dickman (born 1975), US poet
Blaga Dimitrova (1922–2003), Bulgarian poet and politician
Ramdhari Singh Dinkar (1908–1974), Indian Hindi poet, essayist and academic
Diane di Prima (1934–2020), US poet
Paul Dirmeikis (born 1954), French poet
Vladislav Petković Dis (1880–1917), Serbian poet
Thomas M. Disch (1940–2008), US poet, novelist
Tim Dlugos (1950–1990), US poet
Henry Austin Dobson (1840–1921), English poet and essayist
Stephen Dobyns (born 1941), US author, novelist and poet
Lajos Dóczi (1845–1918), Hungarian playwright, poet and politician
Hendrik Doeff (1777–1835), Dutch lexicographer and poet (in Japanese) and Commissioner in the Dejima trading post
Gojko Đogo (born 1940), Serbian poet
Pete Doherty (born 1979), English musician, songwriter and poet
Digby Mackworth Dolben (1848–1867), English poet
Joe Dolce (born 1947), Australian songwriter, poet and essayist
María Magdalena Domínguez (1922–2021), Spanish poet 
John Donne (1572–1631), English poet, satirist and Anglican cleric
H.D., Hilda Doolittle (1886–1961), US Imagist poet
Ap Chuni Dorji, Bhutanese poet
Edward Dorn (1929–1999), US poet and teacher
Tishani Doshi (born 1975), Indian English poet and journalist
Mark Doty (born 1953), US poet and memoirist
Sarah Doudney (1841–1926), English poet and children's writer
Charles Montagu Doughty (1843–1926), English poet, writer and traveler
Alice May Douglas (1865–1943), US poet and author
Gavin Douglas (1474–1522), Scottish bishop, makar and translator
Keith Douglas (1920–1944), English war poet
Rita Dove (born 1952), US poet and author; US Poet Laureate
Ernest Dowson (1867–1900), English poet, novelist and short-story writer
Jane Draycott (living), English poet
Michael Drayton (1563–1631), English poet of Elizabethan era
Aleksander Stavre Drenova (1872–1947), Albanian poet
John Drinkwater (1882–1937), English poet and dramatist
Annette von Droste-Hülshoff (1797–1848), German poet
William Drummond (1585–1649), Scottish poet
William Henry Drummond (1854–1907), Irish-born Canadian poet
Elżbieta Drużbacka (1695 or 1698–1765), Polish poet
John Dryden (1631–1700), English poet, critic and playwright
Toru Dutt (1856–1877), Indian poet and translator writing in French and English

Du–Dy
Guillaume de Salluste Du Bartas (1544–1590), French Huguenot poet
Joachim du Bellay (c. 1522–1560), French poet, critic and La Pléiade member
W. E. B. Du Bois (1868–1963), US writer and activist
Norman Dubie (born 1945), US poet
Jovan Dučić (1871–1943), Bosnian Serb poet, writer and diplomat
Du Fu (712–770), Chinese poet of Tang Dynasty
Du Mu (803–852), Chinese poet of late Tang Dynasty
Carol Ann Duffy (born 1955), Scottish poet and playwright; Poet Laureate of the United Kingdom
Alan Dugan (1923–2003), US poet
Sasha Dugdale (born 1974), English poet, playwright and translator
Richard Duke (1658–1711), English clergyman and poet
Paul Laurence Dunbar (1872–1906), African-US poet, novelist and playwright
William Dunbar (c. 1460 – c. 1520), Scots makar
Robert Duncan (1919–1988), US poet
Camille Dungy (born 1972), US poet, academic and essayist
Douglas Dunn (born 1942), Scottish poet, academic and critic
Stephen Dunn (1939–2021), US poet
Helen Dunmore (1952–2017), English poet, novelist and children's writer
Edward Plunkett, Baron Dunsany (1878–1957), Irish poet
Lawrence Durrell (1912–1990), English novelist, poet and dramatist
Michael Madhusudan Dutt (1824–1873), Bengali poet and dramatist
Stuart Dybek (born 1942), US poet, writer
Sir Edward Dyer (1543–1607), English courtier and poet.
Bob Dylan (born 1941), US singer-songwriter and writer

E
Joan Adeney Easdale (1913–1998), English poet
Richard Eberhart (1904–2005), US poet
Houshang Ebtehaj (1928–2022), Iranian poet
Russell Edson (1935–2014), US poet, novelist and illustrator
Terry Ehret (born 1955), US poet
Max Ehrmann (1872–1945), US writer, poet, and attorney
Joseph Freiherr von Eichendorff (1788–1857), German poet and novelist
Kristín Eiríksdóttir (born 1981), Icelandic poet
George Eliot (Mary Ann Evans) (1819–1880), English novelist, journalist and translator
T. S. Eliot (1888–1965), US/English publisher, playwright and critic
Ebenezer Elliott ("Corn Law rhymer", 1781–1849), English poet 
Royston Ellis (born 1941), English poet
Paul Éluard (1895–1952), French poet
Odysseus Elytis (1911–1996) Greek poet
Claudia Emerson (1957–2014), US poet; Poet Laureate of Virginia
Ralph Waldo Emerson (1803–1882), US essayist, lecturer and poet
Gevorg Emin (1918–1998), Armenian poet, essayist and translator
Mihai Eminescu (1850–1889), Romanian poet, novelist and journalist
William Empson (1906–1984), English literary critic and poet
Yunus Emre (c. 1240 – c. 1321), Turkish poet and Sufi mystic
Michael Ende (1929–1995), German fantasy and children's writer and poet
Leszek Engelking (born 1955), Polish, poet, fiction writer and translator
Paul Engle (1908–1991), US poet, novelist and playwright
Ennius (c. 239 – c. 169 BCE), father of Latin poetry in Rome
D. J. Enright (1920–2002), English poet, novelist and critic
Hans Magnus Enzensberger (born 1929), German writer, poet and translator
János Erdélyi (1814–1868), Hungarian poet and philosopher
Louise Erdrich (born 1954), US novelist, poet and children's writer featuring Native US heritage
Haydar Ergülen (born 1956), Turkish poet
Max Ernst (1891–1976), German poet and artist
Errapragada Erranna, 14th-century Telugu poet
Wolfram von Eschenbach (c. 1170 – c. 1220), German Minnesinger poet and knight
Clayton Eshleman (1935–2022), US poet, translator and editor
Martín Espada (born 1957), US poet and teacher
Florbela Espanca (1894–1930), Portuguese poet
Salvador Espriu (1913–1985), Catalan poet in Spain
Jill Alexander Essbaum (born 1971), US poet
Alter Esselin (1889–1974), Yiddish US poet
Claude Esteban (1935–2006), French poet
Maggie Estep (born 1963), US slam poet and musician
Jerry Estrin (1947–1993), US poet and editor
Euripides (480–406 BCE), Athenian tragedian
Margiad Evans (1909–1958), English poet and novelist
Mari Evans (1923–2017), African-US poet
William Everson (Brother Antoninus) (1912–1994), US poet and critic
Gavin Ewart (1916–1995), English poet
Elisabeth Eybers (1915–2007), South African/Dutch poet; poetry in Afrikaans

F

Fa–Fn
Frederick William Faber (1814–1863), English poet, hymnist and theologian
Kinga Fabó (1953–2021), Hungarian poet and essayist
Faiz Ahmed Faiz (1911–1984), Indian/Pakistani poet
Padraic Fallon (1905–1974), Irish poet
Christian Falster (1690–1752), Danish poet and philologist
Ferenc Faludi (1704–1779), Hungarian poet
György Faludy (1910–2006), Hungarian poet and translator
U. A. Fanthorpe (1929–2009), English poet
Ahmad Faraz (1931–2008), Pakistani Urdu poet and scriptwriter
Eleanor Farjeon (1881–1965), English children's writer, playwright and poet
J. P. Farrell (born 1968), US poet and musician
Forough Farrokhzad (1934–1967), Iranian poet
Elaine Feinstein (1930–2019), English poet, novelist and playwright
Károly Fellinger (born 1963) Hungarian poet in Slovakia
Fenggan (fl. 9th c.), Chinese Zen monk poet under Tang Dynasty
Elijah Fenton (1683–1730), English poet, biographer and translator
James Fenton (1931–2021), Northern Irish linguist and poet in Ulster Scots
James Martin Fenton (born 1949), English poet, journalist and literary critic
Ferdowsi (935–1020), Persian poet
Teréz Ferenczy (1823–1853), Hungarian poet
Robert Fergusson (1750–1774), Scottish poet
Lawrence Ferlinghetti (1919–2021), US poet, painter and activist
Leandro Fernández de Moratín (1760–1828), Spanish dramatist, translator and poet
Jerzy Ficowski (1924–2006), Polish poet, writer and translator
Henry Fielding (1707–1754), English novelist, dramatist and poet
Juan de Dios Filiberto (1885–1964), Argentine poet and musician
Anne Finch, Countess of Winchilsea (1661–1720), English nature poet
Annie Finch (born 1956), US poet, librettist and translator
Ian Hamilton Finlay (1925–2006), Scottish poet, writer and gardener
Roy Fisher (1930–2017), English poet and jazz pianist
Edward Fitzgerald (1809–1883), English poet and translator of Rubaiyat of Omar Khayyam
Robert Fitzgerald (1910–1985), US poet, critic and translator
Marjorie Fleming (1803–1811), Scottish child poet and diarist
Giles Fletcher the Elder (c. 1548–1611), English poet, diplomat and MP
Giles Fletcher the Younger (c. 1586–1623), English poet
John Fletcher (1579–1625), English playwright and poet
John Gould Fletcher (1886–1950), US Imagist poet
Phineas Fletcher (1582–1650), English poet; elder son of Giles Fletcher the elder, brother of Giles the younger
F. S. Flint (1885–1960), English poet and translator

Fo–Fu
Jean Follain (1903–1971), French author and poet
Theodor Fontane (1819–1898), German novelist, poet and realist writer
John Forbes (1950–1998), Australian poet
Carolyn Forché (born 1950), US poet, editor and translator
Ford Madox Ford (1873–1939), English novelist, poet and critic
John Ford (1586–1639), English playwright and poet
John M. Ford (1957–2006), US SF and fantasy writer, game designer and poet
Veronica Forrest-Thomson (1947–1975), Scots poet and critical theorist
Ugo Foscolo (1778–1827), Italian writer, revolutionary and poet
William Fowler (c. 1560–1612), Scottish poet, writer and translator
Janet Frame (1924–2004), New Zealand author
Anatole France (1844–1924), French poet, journalist and novelist
Robert Francis (1901–1987), US poet
Veronica Franco (1546–1591), Italian poet and courtesan
G S Fraser (1915–1980), Scots poet, critic and academic
Gregory Fraser (born 1963), US poet, editor and professor
Naim Frashëri (1846–1900), Albanian poet and writer
Louis-Honoré Fréchette (1839–1908), Canadian poet, politician and playwright
Aleksander Fredro (1793–1876), Polish poet and playwright
Grace Beacham Freeman (1916–2002), US poet and fiction writer; South Carolina Poet Laureate 1985–1986
Nicholas Freeston (1907–1978), English poet
Erich Fried (1921–1988), Austrian-born British poet, writer and translator
Jean Froissart (c. 1337 – c. 1405), French chronicler and court poet
Robert Frost (1874–1963), US poet
Gene Frumkin (1928–2007), US poet and teacher
John Fuller (born 1937), English poet and author, son of Roy Fuller
Roy Fuller (1912–1991), English poet
Alice Fulton (born 1952), US poet and novelist; Bobbitt National Prize for Poetry winner
John Furnival (1933–2020), British visual and concrete poet
Milán Füst (1888–1967), Hungarian poet, novelist and playwright
Fuzûlî (c. 1483–1556), Azerbaijani and Ottoman poet

G

Ga–Go
Tadeusz Gajcy (1922–1944), Polish poet
Konstanty Ildefons Gałczyński (1905–1953), Polish poet and stage writer
Karina Galvez (born 1964), Ecuadorian poet
James Galvin (born 1951), US poet
Etienne-Paulin Gagne (1808–1876), French poet, essayist and inventor
János Garay (1812–1853), Hungarian poet and journalist
Robert Garioch (wrote as Robert Garioch Sutherland, 1909–1981), Scottish poet and translator
Hamlin Garland (1860–1940), US novelist, poet and essayist
Raymond Garlick (1926–2011), Anglo-Welsh poet and editor
Richard Garnett (1835–1906), English scholar, biographer and poet
Jean Garrigue (1914–1972), US poet
Samuel Garth (1661–1719), English physician and poet
George Gascoigne (1535–1577), English poet, soldier and would-be courtier
David Gascoyne (1916–2001), English poet of the Surrealist movement
Théophile Gautier (1811–1872), French poet, dramatist and novelist
John Gay (1685–1732), English poet and dramatist
Yehonatan Geffen (born 1947), Israeli author, poet and playwright
Theodor Seuss Geisel (Dr. Seuss) (1904–1991), US writer, poet and cartoonist
Juan Gelman (1930–2014), Argentinian poet, writer and translator
Stefan George (1868–1933), German poet, editor and translator
Dan Gerber (born 1940), US poet
Ágnes Gergely (born 1933), Hungarian poet, novelist and translator
Paul Gerhardt (1607–1676), German hymnist
Cezary Geroń (1960–1998), Polish poet, journalist and translator
Mirza Asadulla Khan Ghalib (1797–1869) Indian poet in Urdu and Persian
Charles Ghigna (Father Goose) (born 1946), US children's author, poet and feature writer
Reginald Gibbons (born 1947), US poet, fiction writer and critic
Khalil Gibran (1883–1931), Lebanese-US artist, poet and writer
Wilfrid Wilson Gibson (1878–1962), English poet
Ryan Giggs  (born 1973), Welsh poet, footballer and homewrecker
Jack Gilbert (1925–2012), US poet
W. S. Gilbert (1836–1911), English poet
Zuzanna Ginczanka (Sara Ginzburg, 1917–1945), Polish poet
Allen Ginsberg (1926–1997), US Beat Generation poet
Dana Gioia (born 1950), US writer, critic and poet
Nikki Giovanni (born 1943), US poet, writer and educator
Zinaida Gippius (1869–1945), Russian poet, playwright and religious thinker
Giglio Gregorio Giraldi (1479–1552), Italian scholar and poet
Giuseppe Giusti (1809–1850), Italian poet
Denis Glover (1912–1980), New Zealand poet and publisher
Louise Glück (born 1943), US poet; US Poet Laureate
Guru Gobind Singh (1666–1708), Indian poet in Punjabi, Urdu, etc.
Cyprian Godebski (1765–1809), Polish poet and novelist
Gérald Godin (1938–1994), Canadian poet in French
Patricia Goedicke (1931–2006), US poet
Johann Wolfgang von Goethe (1749–1832), German writer, artist and politician
Octavian Goga (1881–1938), Romanian poet, playwright and translator
Leah Goldberg (1911–1970), Hebrew-language poet, playwright and writer
Rumer Godden (1907–1998), English children's writer and poet
Ziya Gökalp (1876–1924), Turkish sociologist, writer and poet
Oliver Goldsmith (1730–1774), Anglo-Irish writer and poet
Pavel Golia (1887–1959), Slovenian poet and playwright
George Gomri (born 1934), Hungarian poet and journalist (also in English)
Luis de Góngora (1561–1627), Spanish lyric poet
Lorna Goodison (born 1947), Jamaican poet
Paul Goodman (1911–1972), US novelist, playwright and poet
Barnabe Googe or Gooche (1540–1594), English pastoral poet and translator
Adam Lindsay Gordon (1833–1870), Australian poet and politician
Gábor Görgey (born 1929), Hungarian poet and politician
Sergei Gorodetsky (1884–1967), Russian poet
Hedwig Gorski (born 1949), US performance poet and artist
Herman Gorter (1864–1927), Dutch poet and socialist
Sir Edmund William Gosse (1849–1928), English poet, author and critic
Remy de Gourmont (1858–1915), French poet, novelist and critic
John Gower (c. 1330–1408), English poet and friend of Chaucer

Gr–Gy
Anders Abraham Grafström (1790–1870), Swedish historian, priest and poet
James Graham, 1st Marquess of Montrose (1612–1650), Scottish nobleman, soldier and poet
Jorie Graham (born 1950), US poet and first female Boylston Professor at Harvard
W S Graham (1918–1986), Scottish poet
Mark Granier (born 1957), Irish poet and photographer
Alex Grant (living), Scottish US poet and teacher
Günter Grass (1927–2015), German novelist, poet and playwright; 1999 Nobel Prize in Literature
Richard Graves (1715–1804), English poet and essayist
Robert Graves (1895–1985), English author and scholar
Sir Alexander Gray (1882–1968), Scottish translator, writer and poet
Thomas Gray (1716–1771), English poet
Robert Greene (1558–1592), English author and poet
Dora Greenwell (1821–1882), English poet
Linda Gregg (1942–2019) US poet
Horace Gregory (1898–1982), US poet, translator and critic
Eamon Grennan (born 1941), Irish poet
Fulke Greville, 1st Baron Brooke (1554–1628), English poet, dramatist and statesman
Susan Griffin (born 1943), US poet and writer
Ann Griffiths (1776–1805), Welsh poet and hymnist
Bill Griffiths (1948–2007), English poet and Anglo-Saxon scholar
Jane Griffiths (born 1970), English poet and literary historian
Rachel Eliza Griffiths (born 1978), US poet, photographer and visual artist
Mariela Griffor (born 1961), Chilean poet, short-story writer and scholar
Geoffrey Grigson (1905–1985), English poet and critic
Franz Grillparzer (1791–1872), Austrian writer, poet and dramatist
Nicholas Grimald (1519–1562), English poet and dramatist
Angelina Weld Grimké (1880–1958), African-US playwright and poet
Charlotte Forten Grimké (1835–1914), African-US poet
Rufus W. Griswold (1815–1857), US anthologist, poet and critic
Stanisław Grochowiak (1934–1976), Polish poet and dramatist
Nikanor Grujić (1810–1887), Serbian writer, poet and bishop
Stanisław Grochowiak (1934–1976), Polish poet and dramatist
Philip Gross (born 1952), English poet, novelist and playwright
Igo Gruden (1893–1948), Slovene poet and translator
N. F. S. Grundtvig (1783–1872), Danish poet, pastor and historian
Wioletta Grzegorzewska (born 1974), Polish poet and writer
Barbara Guest (1920–2006), US poet and prose stylist
Edgar Guest (1881–1959), English-born US poet
Paul Guest (living), US poet and memoirist
Bimal Guha (born 1952), Bangladesh poet writing in Bengali
Guillaume de Lorris (c. 1200 – c. 1240), French scholar and poet
Jorge Guillén (1893–1984), Spanish poet
Nicolás Guillén (1902–1989), Cuban poet, activist and writer
Guido Guinizelli (c. 1230–1276), Italian poet
Guiot de Provins (died after 1208), French poet and trouvère
Malcolm Guite (born 1957)
Gül Baba (died 1541), Ottoman Bektashi dervish poet
Nikolay Gumilyov (1886–1921), Russian poet who founded acmeism
Ivan Gundulić (Gianfrancesco Gondola) (1589–1638), Croatian Baroque poet
Thom Gunn (1929–2004), Anglo-US poet
Lee Gurga (born 1949), US haiku poet
Ivor Gurney (1890–1937), English composer and poet
Lars Gustafsson (1936–2016), Swedish poet, novelist and scholar
Pedro Juan Gutiérrez (born 1950), Cuban novelist and poet
Beth Gylys (born 1964), US poet and professor
István Gyöngyösi (1620–1704), Hungarian poet
Géza Gyóni (1884–1917), Hungarian poet
Brion Gysin (1916–1986), English writer and sound poet
Gabor G. Gyukics (born 1958), Hungarian-US poet and translator (also in English)

H

Ha
Rafey Habib (living), Indian-born Muslim poet and scholar
Marilyn Hacker (born 1942), US poet, translator and critic
Hadraawi (born 1943), Somaliland poet and songwriter
Hafez (1315–1390), Persian poet
Hai Zi (1964–1989), Chinese poet
John Haines (1924–2011), US poet and educator
Donald Hall (1928–2018), US poet, writer and critic; US Poet Laureate
Arthur Hallam (1811–1833), English poet, subject of In Memoriam A.H.H. by Alfred Tennyson
Michael Hamburger (1924–2007), English translator, poet and academic
Han Yu (768–824), Chinese essayist and poet of Tang dynasty
Hanshan (fl. 9th c.), Chinese poet of Tang dynasty
Thomas Hardy (1840–1928), English novelist and poet
Charles Harpur (1813–1868), Australian poet
Sir Theodore Wilson Harris (1921–2018), Guyanese poet, novelist and essayist
Jim Harrison (1937–2016), US poet, novelist and essayist
Tony Harrison (born 1937), English poet and playwright
Carla Harryman (born 1952), US poet, essayist and playwright
David Harsent (born 1942), English poet and TV scriptwriter
Paul Hartal (born 1936), Hungarian-born Canadian poet, painter and critic
Peter Härtling (1933–2017), German writer and poet
Michael Hartnett (1941–1999), Irish poet writing in English and Irish
Julia Hartwig (1921–2017), Polish poet, writer and translator
Gwen Harwood (1920–1995), Australian poet and librettist
Alamgir Hashmi (born 1951), English poet of Pakistani origin
Ahmet Haşim (c. 1884–1933), Turkish poet
Robert Hass (born 1941), US poet; former Poet Laureate
Mohammed Abdullah Hassan (1856–1920), emir of the Dervish movement, of which Diiriye Guure was sultan
Olav H. Hauge (1908–1994), Norwegian poet
Gerhart Hauptmann (1862–1946), German dramatist, poet and novelist; Nobel Prize in Literature, 1912
Stephen Hawes (died 1523), English poet
Robert Stephen Hawker (1803–1875), English poet, antiquarian and Anglican priest
George Campbell Hay (1915–1984), Scots poet and translator in Scottish Gaelic, Lowland Scots and English
Gilbert Hay (fl. 15th c.), Scottish poet and translator in Middle Scots
Robert Hayden (1913–1980), US poet, essayist and educator; 1976 US Poet Laureate
William Hayley (1745–1820), English writer
Tony Haynes (born 1960), US poet, songwriter and lyricist

He
Seamus Heaney (1939–2013), Irish poet, playwright and translator; 1995 Nobel Prize in Literature
Josephine D. Heard (1861 – c. 1921), US teacher and poet
John Heath-Stubbs (1918–2006), English poet and translator
Anne Hébert (1916–2000), Canadian poet and novelist
Anthony Hecht (1923–2004), US poet
Jennifer Michael Hecht (born 1965), US poet, historian and philosopher
Allison Hedge Coke (born 1958), US poet, writer and performer
Markus Hediger (born 1959), Swiss writer and translator
Ilona Hegedűs (living), poet
John Hegley (born 1953), English performance poet, comedian and songwriter
Heinrich Heine (1797–1856), German poet, essayist and literary critic
Lyn Hejinian (born 1941), US poet, essayist and translator
Acharya Hemachandra (1089–1172), Jain scholar, poet and polymath
Felicia Hemans (1793–1835), English poet
Marian Hemar (1901–1972), Polish poet, songwriter and playwright
Essex Hemphill (1957–1995), US poet and activist
Hamish Henderson (1919–2002), Scottish poet, songwriter and catalyst for folk revival in Scotland
William Ernest Henley (1849–1903), English poet, critic and editor
Adrian Henri (1932–2000), English poet and painter
Robert Henryson (died c. 1500), Scottish poet
Edward Herbert, 1st Baron Herbert of Cherbury (1583–1648), Anglo-Welsh soldier, historian, poet and philosopher; brother of George Herbert
George Herbert (1593–1633), public orator and poet
Mary Herbert, Countess of Pembroke (1561–1621) (née Sidney), early English woman in literature
Zbigniew Herbert (1924–1998), Polish poet, essayist and dramatist
Johann Gottfried Herder (1744–1803), German philosopher, theologian and literary critic
Miguel Hernández (1910–1942), Spanish poet and playwright of Generation of '27 and Generation of '36 movements
Herodas or Herondas (3rd c. BCE), Greek poet and author of humorous dramatic scenes in verse
Antoine Héroet (died 1568), French poet
Robert Herrick (1591–1674), English poet
Thomas Kibble Hervey (1799–1859), Scottish-born English poet and critic
Hesiod (fl. 750–650 BCE), Ancient Greek poet
Phoebe Hesketh (1909–2005), English poet
Hermann Hesse (1877–1962), German-Swiss poet, novelist and painter
Dorothy Hewett (1923–2002), Australian feminist poet, novelist and playwright
John Harold Hewitt (1907–1987), Northern Irish poet
William Heyen (born 1940), US poet, literary critic, novelist
Thomas Heywood (c. 1570s – 1641), English playwright, actor and author

Hi–Hy
Dick Higgins (1938–1998), English poet and publisher
Scott Hightower (born 1952), US poet and teacher
Nâzım Hikmet (1902–1963), Turkish poet, playwright and novelist
Geoffrey Hill (1932–2016), English poet and professor
Selima Hill (born 1945), English poet
Hilda Hilst (1930–2004), Brazilian poet, playwright and novelist
Ellen Hinsey (born 1960), US poet
Hipponax (6th c. BCE) of Ephesus, Ancient Greek iambic poet
Hirato Renkichi (1893–1922), Japanese avant-garde poet
Rozalie Hirs (born 1965), Dutch poet
Jane Hirshfield (born 1953), US poet
George Parks Hitchcock (1914–2010), US poet, playwright and painter
H. L. Hix (born 1960), US poet and academic
Marian Hluszkewycz (1877–1935), Russian poet
Thomas Hoccleve or Occleve (c. 1368 – 1426), English poet and clerk
Michael Hofmann (born 1957), German-born poet and translator in English
Hugo von Hofmannsthal (1874–1929), Austrian novelist, poet and dramatist
James Hogg (1770–1835), Scottish poet and novelist
David Holbrook (1923–2011), English writer, poet and academic
Friedrich Hölderlin (1770–1843), German lyric poet
Margaret Holford (1778–1852), English poet and novelist
Barbara Holland (1933–2010), US author
John Hollander (1929–2013), Jewish-US poet and literary critic
Matthew Hollis (born 1971), English poet
Oliver Wendell Holmes (1809–1894), US poet, professor and author
Homer (fl. 8th c. BCE), Greek epic poet
Thomas Hood (1799–1845), English humorist and poet; father of playwright and editor Tom Hood
A. D. Hope (1907–2000), Australian satirical poet and essayist
Gerard Manley Hopkins (1844–1889), English poet and Jesuit priest
Horace (Quintus Horatius Flaccus) (65–08 BCE), Roman lyric poet
George Moses Horton (1797–1884), African-US poet
Joan Houlihan, US poet
A. E. Housman (1859–1936), English poet and classicist
Libby Houston (living), English poet, botanist and rock climber
Henry Howard, Earl of Surrey (1517–1547), English Renaissance poet
Richard Howard (1929–2022), US poet, critic and essayist
Fanny Howe (born 1940), US poet and fiction writer
Susan Howe (born 1937), US poet, scholar and essayist
Hrotsvitha (died c. 1002), poet and first known female dramatist, from Lower Saxony
Mohammad Nurul Huda (born 1949), Bangladeshi poet in Bengali
John Ceiriog Hughes (1832–1887), Welsh poet in Welsh
Langston Hughes (1902–1967), US poet, novelist and playwright
Ted Hughes (1930–1998), English poet and children's writer; Poet Laureate of the United Kingdom
Richard Hugo (1923–1982), US poet
Victor Hugo (1802–1885), French poet, novelist and dramatist
Vicente Huidobro (1893–1948), Chilean poet
Lynda Hull (1954–1994), US poet
Keri Hulme (1947–2021), New Zealand poet and fiction writer
Thomas Ernest Hulme (1883–1917), English critic and poet
Alexander Hume (1560–1609), Scottish poet
Leigh Hunt (1784–1859), English critic, essayist and poet
Sam Hunt (born 1946), New Zealand poet
Hồ Xuân Hương (1772–1822), Vietnamese poet
Aldous Huxley (1894–1963), English novelist, poet and travel writer
Helen von Kolnitz Hyer (1896–1983), US poet and writer; South Carolina Poet Laureate 1974–1983

I
Khadijah Ibrahiim (fl. 2022), British poet
Henrik Johan Ibsen (1828–1906), Norwegian playwright, director and poet
Ibycus (fl. late 6th c. BCE), Ancient Greek lyric poet
Ikkyu (1394–1481), Japanese Zen Buddhist monk and poet
Vojislav Ilić (1860–1894), Serbian poet
Gyula Illyés (1902–1983), Hungarian poet and novelist
Maria Ilnicka (1825 or 1827–1897), Polish poet, novelist and translator
Sir Dr. Muhammad Iqbal (1877–1938), Indian poet in Urdu and Persian
Avetik Isahakyan (1875–1957), Armenian lyric poet
Sabit Ince (born 1954), Turkish lyric poet
Inge Israel (1927–2019), Canadian poet and playwright
Wacław Iwaniuk (1912–2001), Polish poet and journalist
Jarosław Iwaszkiewicz (Eleuter, 1894–1980), Polish poet, dramatist and translator
Sergey Izgiyaev (1922–1972), Russian poet, playwright and translator of Mountain Jewish descent

J
FP Jac (1955–2008), Danish poet
Violet Jacob (1863–1946), Scottish poet in Scots
Rolf Jacobsen (1907–1994), Norwegian poet and writer
Ada Jafarey (1924–2015) Pakistani poet in Urdu
Richard Jago (1715–1781), English poet
Đura Jakšić (1832–1878), Serbian poet, painter and dramatist
James I, King of Scots (1394–1437), author of The Kingis Quair
James VI and I (1566–1625), King of Scots and of England and Ireland
Christine James (born 1954), Welsh poet and academic
Clive James (1939–2019), Australian author, poet and memoirist
Ernst Jandl (1925–2000), Austrian writer, poet and translator
Klemens Janicki (1516–1543), Polish poet in Latin
Janus Pannonius (1434–1472), Hungarian/Slavonian poet in Latin
Patricia Janus (1932–2006), US poet and artist
Mark F. Jarman (born 1952), US poet and critic
Randall Jarrell (1914–1965), US poet, children's author and novelist; US Poet Laureate
Bruno Jasieński (1901–1938), Polish poet, novelist and playwright
Mieczysław Jastrun (1903–1983), Polish poet and essayist
László Jávor (1903–1992), Hungarian poet
Robinson Jeffers (1887–1962), US poet
Vojin Jelić (1921–2004), Croatian Serb poet and writer
Rod Jellema (1927–2018), US poet, teacher and translator
Simon Jenko (1835–1869), Slovene poet, lyricist and writer
Elizabeth Jennings (1926–2001), English poet
Jia Dao (779–843), Chinese poet active under Tang Dynasty
John of the Cross (1542–1591), Spanish mystic and poet
Edmund John (1883–1917), English poet
Georgia Douglas Johnson (1880–1966), US poet
Helene Johnson (1906–1995), African-US poet
James Weldon Johnson (1871–1938), US author, poet and folklorist
Lionel Johnson (1867–1902), English poet, essayist and critic
Emily Pauline Johnson (in Mohawk: Tekahionwake) (1861–1913), Canadian writer, performer and poet marking First Nations heritage
Samuel Johnson (1709–1784), English poet, essayist and lexicographer
George Benson Johnston (1913–2004), Canadian poet, translator and academic
Anna Jókai (1932–2017), Hungarian poet and prose writer
David Jones (1895–1974), English artist and poet
Edward Smyth Jones (1881–1968), African-American poet
Richard Jones (living), English US poet
Ben Jonson (1573–1637), English poet and dramatist
June Jordan (1936–2002), US poet and educator
Anthony Joseph (born 1966), British/Trinidadian poet, novelist and musician
Jenny Joseph (1932–2018), English poet
Jovan Jovanović Zmaj (1833–1904), Serbian poet, physician
James Joyce (1882–1941), Irish novelist and poet
Attila József (1905–1937), Hungarian poet
Frank Judge (1946–2021), US editor, poet and film critic
Ferenc Juhász (1928–2015), Hungarian poet
Gyula Juhász (1883–1937), Hungarian poet
Jamal Jumá, Iraqi poet and researcher
Donald Justice (1925–2004), US poet
Juvenal (fl. 1st c. – 2nd c. CE), Roman poet and satirist
Jumoke Verissimo (born 1979), Nigerian poet
Jaydeep Sarangi (born 1973), Indian poet in English

K

Ka–Kh
Abhay K (born 1980), Indian poet and diplomat
Kabir (1440–1518), mystic poet and sant of India
Margit Kaffka (1880–1918), Hungarian poet and novelist
Kālidāsa (fl. c. 4th c.), Sanskrit poet
Kambar (c. 1180–1250), Tamil poet
Anna Kamieńska (1920–1986), Polish poet, translator and critic
Kannadasan (1927–1981), Tamil poet, author and lyricist
Jim Kacian (born 1953), US haiku poet and editor
Uuno Kailas (1901–1933), Finnish poet, author and translator
Chester Kallman (1921–1975), US poet, librettist and translator
László Kálnoky (1912–1985), Hungarian poet and translator
Kálmán Kalocsay (1891–1976), Hungarian and Esperanto poet
Anna Kamieńska (1920–1986), Polish poet, writer and critic
Ilya Kaminsky (born 1977), Russian-US poet, critic and translator
Orhan Veli Kanik (1914–1950), Turkish poet
Sándor Kányádi (1929–2018), Hungarian poet and translator from Romania
Jaan Kaplinski (1941–2021), Estonian poet, philosopher and critic
Adeena Karasick (born 1965), Canadian/US poet, media artist and essayist
Vim Karenine (born 1933), US poet, essayist and novelist
György Károly (1953–2018), Hungarian poet and critic
Franciszek Karpiński (1741–1825), Polish poet
Mary Karr (born 1955), US poet, essayist and memoirist
Siavash Kasrai (1927–1996), Iranian poet
Julia Kasdorf (born 1962), US poet
Laura Kasischke (born 1961), US poet and fiction writer
Jan Kasprowicz (1860–1926), Polish poet, playwright and critic
Lajos Kassák (1887–1967), Hungarian poet, novelist and painter
Erich Kästner (1899–1974), German author, poet and satirist
József Katona (1791–1830), Hungarian playwright and poet
Bob Kaufman (1925–1986), US beat poet and surrealist
Shirley Kaufman (1923–2016), US poet and translator
Rupi Kaur (born 1992), Indo-Canadian poet and photographer 
Patrick Kavanagh (1904–1967), Irish poet and novelist
Nikos Kavvadias (1910–1975), Greek poet
Kazi Nazrul Islam (1899–1976), Bengali poet, musician and revolutionary
John Keats (1795–1821), English Romantic poet
Weldon Kees (1914–1955), US poet, novelist and critic
Isabella Kelly (1759–1857), Scottish poet and novelist
Arthur Kelton (died 1549/1550), rhymer on Welsh history
Miranda Kennedy (born 1975), US poet
Walter Kennedy (c. 1455–1518), Scottish makar
X. J. Kennedy (born 1929), US poet, anthologist and children's writer
Jane Kenyon (1947–1995), US poet and translator
Géza Képes (1909–1989), Hungarian poet and translator
Jack Kerouac (1922–1969), US novelist and poet
Sidney Keyes (1922–1943), English poet killed in action in World War II
Keorapetse Kgositsile (1938–2018), South African poet
Mimi Khalvati (born 1944), Iranian-born British poet
Dilwar Khan (1937–2013), Bangladeshi poet
Khushal Khan Khattak (1613–1689), Pashtun Afghan poet, warrior and tribal chief
Omar Khayyám (1048–1122), Persian mathematician, astronomer and poet
Vladislav Khodasevich (1886–1939), Russian poet and literary critic
Talib Khundmiri (1938–2011), Indian poet and humorist in Urdu
Ab'ul Hasan Yamīn ud-Dīn Khusrow (1253–1325), Sufi poet, scholar and musician

Ki–Ky
Saba Kidane (born 1978), Eritrean poet
Søren Kierkegaard (1813–1855), Danish philosopher and poet
Emelihter Kihleng Pohnpeian poet and academic
Andrzej Tadeusz Kijowski (born 1954), Polish poet and politician
Takarai Kikaku (1661–1707), Japanese haikai poet and disciple of Matsuo Bashō
Joyce Kilmer (1886–1918), US writer and poet
Edward King (1612–1637), Irish-born subject of Milton's Lycidas
Henry King (1592–1669), English poet and bishop
William King (1663–1712), English poet
Thomas Hansen Kingo (1634–1703), Danish bishop, poet and hymnist
Gottfried Kinkel (1815–1882), German poet and revolutionary
Galway Kinnell (1927–2014), US poet; Pulitzer Prize for Poetry 1982
John Kinsella (born 1963), Australian poet, novelist and essayist
Thomas Kinsella (1928–2021), Irish poet, translator and editor
Rudyard Kipling (1865–1936), English fiction writer and poet
Easterine Kire (born 1959), Naga poet and novelist
Danilo Kiš (1935–1989), Serbian fiction writer and poet
Necip Fazıl Kısakürek (1904–1983), Turkish poet, novelist and playwright
Atala Kisfaludy (1836–1911), Hungarian poet
Iya Kiva (born 1984), Ukrainian poet
Eila Kivikk'aho (1921–2004), Finnish poet
Carolyn Kizer (1925–2014), US poet; Pulitzer Prize for Poetry 1985
Sarah Klassen (born 1932), Canadian poet and fiction writer
August Kleinzahler (born 1949), US poet
Friedrich Gottlieb Klopstock (1724–1803), German poet
Franciszek Dionizy Kniaźnin (1750–1807), Polish poet and Jesuit
Etheridge Knight (1931–1991), African-US poet
Kobayashi Issa (1763–1828), Japanese haikai poet
Jan Kochanowski (1530–1584), Polish Renaissance poet
Kenneth Koch (1925–2002), US poet, playwright and professor
Jan Kochanowski (1530–1584), Polish poet
Petar Kočić (1877–1916), Bosnian Serb writer
István Koháry (1649–1731), Hungarian poet
Ferenc Kölcsey (1790–1838), Hungarian poet
Aladár Komját (1891–1937), Hungarian poet
Yusef Komunyakaa (born 1947), US poet and teacher; Pulitzer Prize for Poetry 1994
Béla Kondor (1931–1972), Hungarian poet, prose writer and painter
Faik Konitza (1875–1942), Albanian poet
Halina Konopacka (1900–1989), Polish poet and athlete
Maria Konopnicka (1842–1910), Polish poet, novelist and children's writer
Ted Kooser (born 1939), US poet; US Poet Laureate 2004–2006
Stanisław Korab-Brzozowski (1876–1901), Polish poet and translator
Julian Kornhauser (born 1946), Polish poet, novelist and critic
Apollo Korzeniowski (1820–1869), Polish poet, playwright and translator, father of Joseph Conrad
Srečko Kosovel (1904–1926), Slovene expressionist poet
József Kossics (Jožef Košič, 1788–1867), Hungarian/Slovene poet and priest
Laza Kostić (1841–1910), Serbian poet, writer and polyglot
Dezső Kosztolányi (1885–1936), Hungarian poet and prose writer
Gopi Kottoor (born 1956), Indian poet, playwright and editor
Urszula Kozioł (born 1931), Polish poet
Taja Kramberger (born 1970), Slovene poet, translator and anthropologist
Ignacy Krasicki (1735–1801), Polish poet and novelist
Zygmunt Krasiński (1812–1859), Polish poet
Zlatko Krasni (1951–2008), Serbian poet
Ruth Krauss (1901–1993), US poet and children's book author
Krayem Awad (born 1948), Syrian-Austrian painter, sculptor and poet
Carolyn Kreiter-Foronda (born 1946), US writer; Poet Laureate of Virginia
Katarzyna Krenz (born 1953), poet, novelist and painter
Miroslav Krleža (1893–1981), Croatian/Yugoslav poet and novelist
Antjie Krog (born 1952), South African poet, academic and writer
Józef Krupiński (1930–1998), Polish poet
Ryszard Krynicki (born 1943), Polish poet and translator
Marilyn Krysl (born 1942), US poet and fiction writer
Andrzej Krzycki (1482–1537), Polish poet and archbishop

Žofia Kubini (fl. 17th c.), Hungarian poet in early Czech
Paweł Kubisz (1907–1968), Polish poet and journalist
Péter Kuczka (1923–1999), Hungarian poet and critic
Anatoly Kudryavitsky (born 1954), Russian/Irish novelist, poet and translator
Endre Kukorelly (born 1951), Hungarian poet and journalist
Maxine Kumin (1925–2014), US poet; US Poet Laureate 1981–82
Stanley Kunitz (1905–2006), US poet; US Poet Laureate 1974 and 2000
Yanka Kupala (1882–1942), Belarus poet
Tuli Kupferberg (1923–2010), US counterculture poet and author
Jalu Kurek (1904–1983), Polish poet and prose writer
Dharanendra Kurkuri (born 1942), Kannada poet, translator, and columnist
Momoko Kuroda (黒田杏子, born 1938), Japanese haiku poet
Mira Kuś (born 1958), Polish poet
Kusumagraj (1912–1999), Indian Marathi poet, writer and humanist
Onat Kutlar (1936–1995), Turkish writer and poet
Stephen Kuusisto (born 1955), US poet
Sir Francis Kynaston or Kinaston (1587–1642), English poet
Kyoshi Takahama (1874–1959), Japanese poet

L

La
Jean de La Fontaine (1621–1695), French fabulist
Ilmar Laaban (1921–2000), Estonian poet
Pierre Labrie (born 1972), Canadian poet in French
László Ladányi (1907–1992), Hungarian-Israeli poet and writer
Jules Laforgue (1860–1887), Franco-Uruguayan poet
Jarkko Laine (1947–2006), Finnish poet, writer and playwright
Ivan V. Lalić (1931–1996), Serbian poet
Philip Lamantia (1927–2005), US poet and lecturer
Kendrick Lamar (born 1987), US poet and hip-hop artist
Alphonse de Lamartine (1790–1869), French writer, poet and politician
Charles Lamb (1775–1834), English essayist and poet
Peter Lampe (born 1954), German scholar, writer and poet
Letitia Elizabeth Landon (L. E. L.) (1802–1838), English poet and novelist.
Walter Savage Landor (1775–1864), English writer and poet
Antoni Lange (1863–1929), Polish poet, philosopher and translator
William Langland (c. 1332 – c. 1386) probable English author of dream-vision Piers Plowman
Emilia Lanier (1569–1645), English poet
Sebestyén Tinódi Lantos (c. 1510–1556), Hungarian poet and historian
Laozi (Lau-tzu) (fl. 6th c. BCE), Chinese philosopher and poet
Alda Lara (1930–1962), Angolan poet
Rebecca Hammond Lard (1772–1855), US poet
Bruce Larkin (born 1957), US children's author and poet
Philip Larkin (1922–1985), English poet and novelist
Claudia Lars (1899–1974), Salvadoran poet
Else Lasker-Schüler (1869–1945), German poet and playwright
Lasus of Hermione (6th c. BCE), Greek lyric poet from Hermione in Argolid
Evelyn Lau (born 1971), Canadian poet and novelist
James Laughlin (1914–1997), US poet and publisher
Ann Lauterbach (born 1942), US poet, essayist and professor
Comte de Lautréamont (1846–1870), Uruguayan/French poet
Dorianne Laux (born 1952), US poet
Christine Lavant (1915–1973), Austrian poet and novelist
D. H. Lawrence (1885–1930), English novelist, poet and critic
Henry Lawson (1867–1922), Australian writer and poet; son of Louisa Lawson
Louisa Lawson (1848–1920), Australian poet and feminist
Robert Lax (1915–2000), US poet
Laxmi Prasad Devkota (1909–1959), Nepalese poet and scholar
Henryka Łazowertówna (1909–1942), Polish poet

Le
Edward Lear (1812–1888), English poet, artist and illustrator
Stanisław Jerzy Lec (1909–1966), Polish poet and aphorist
Joanna Lech (born 1984), Polish poet and novelist
Jan Lechoń (1899–1956), Polish poet, critic and diplomat
Francis Ledwidge (1887–1917), Irish war poet
David Lee (born 1966), US poet
Dennis Lee (born 1939), Canadian poet, editor and critic
David Lehman (born 1948), US poet and editor
Ágnes Lehóczky (born 1976), Hungarian poet, academic and translator
Eino Leino (1878–1926), Finnish poet and journalist
Brad Leithauser (born 1953), US poet, novelist and essayist
Alexander Lenard (1910–1972) Hungarian writer and poet
Sue Lenier (born 1957), English poet and playwright
Lalitha Lenin (born 1946), Indian poet
Krystyna Lenkowska (born 1957), Polish poet and translator
Charlotte Lennox (c. 1730–1804), Scottish poet and novelist
John Leonard (born 1965), Australian poet
Giacomo Leopardi (1798–1837), Italian poet, essayist and philologist
Mikhail Lermontov (1814–1841), Russian writer, poet and painter
Ben Lerner (born 1979), US poet, novelist and critic
Bolesław Leśmian (1877–1937), Polish poet and artist
Rika Lesser (born 1953), US poet and translator
Gotthold Ephraim Lessing (1729–1781), German writer, philosopher and dramatist
Denise Levertov (1927–1997), British-born US poet
Dana Levin (born 1965), US poet and teacher
Philip Levine (1928–2015), US poet; 2011–2012 US Poet Laureate
Larry Levis (1946–1996), US poet
D. A. Levy (1942–1968), US poet, artist and publisher
William Levy (1939–2019), US poet, fiction writer and editor
Oswald LeWinter (1931–2013), poet
Alun Lewis (1915–1944), Welsh poet in English
C. S. Lewis (1898–1963), Northern Irish novelist, poet and essayist
Gwyneth Lewis (born 1959), Welsh poet; inaugural National Poet of Wales
J. Patrick Lewis (born 1942), US children's poet
Saunders Lewis (1893–1985), Welsh poet, dramatist and critic
Wyndham Lewis (1884–1957), English painter and author

Li–Ly
Li Houzhu (937–978), Chinese poet and ruler of Southern Tang Kingdom (961–975 CE)
José Lezama Lima (1910–1976), Cuban writer and poet
Tim Liardet (born 1959), English poet, critic and professor
Li Bai (701–762), Chinese Tang dynasty poet
Jerzy Liebert (1904–1931), Polish poet
Li Jiao, poet under Tang and Zhou dynasties
Li Qingzhao (1084–1151), Chinese Song dynasty writer and poet
Li Shangyin (813–858), Chinese late Tang-dynasty poet
Tim Lilburn (born 1950), Canadian poet and essayist
Anne Morrow Lindbergh (1906–2001), US author and aviator; wife of Charles Lindbergh
Jack Lindeman (fl. late 20th c.), US poet and critic 
Sarah Lindsay (born 1958), US poet
Rossy Evelin Lima (born 1986), Mexican poet
Vachel Lindsay (1879–1931), US poet
Ewa Lipska (born 1945), Polish poet
László Listi (1628–1662), Hungarian poet
Józef Łobodowski (1909–1988), Polish poet and political thinker
Terry Locke (born 1946), New Zealand poet, anthologist and academic
Thomas Lodge (1558–1625), English dramatist and writer
Iain Lom (c. 1624 – c. 1710), Scottish Gaelic poet
Henry Wadsworth Longfellow (1807–1882), US poet and educator
Michael Longley (born 1939), Northern Irish poet
Federico García Lorca (1898–1936), Spanish poet, dramatist and stage director
Audre Lorde (1934–1992), Caribbean-US writer, poet and librarian
Richard Lovelace (1618–1658), English Cavalier poet
Amy Lowell (1874–1925), US poet
James Russell Lowell (1819–1891), US poet, critic and diplomat
Robert Lowell (1917–1977), US poet; 1947 US Poet Laureate
Maria White Lowell (1821–1853), US poet and abolitionist
Solomon Löwisohn (1788–1821), Hungarian Jewish poet and historian in Hebrew and German
Mina Loy (1882–1966), English poet, playwright and novelist
Lu You (1125–1209), Chinese Song dynasty poet
Stanisław Herakliusz Lubomirski (1642–1702), Polish poet, writer and politician
Gherasim Luca (1913–1994), Romanian poet and surrealist
Lucan (39–65 CE), Roman poet
Edward Lucie-Smith (born 1933), English writer, poet and broadcaster
Gaius Lucilius (fl. 2nd c. BCE), Roman satirist
Lucilius Junior (fl. 1st c. CE), poet and Procurator of Sicily
Lucretius (c. 99 BCE – c. 55 BCE), Roman poet and philosopher
Fitz Hugh Ludlow (1836–1870), US author, journalist and explorer
Edith Gyömrői Ludowyk (1896–1987), Hungarian poet and politician
Luo Binwang (640–684), Chinese Tang-dynasty writer and poet
Thomas Lux (1946–2017), US poet
Mario Luzi (1914–2005), Italian poet
John Lydgate (1370–1450), English monk and poet
John Lyly (1553–1606), English writer, poet and dramatist
Sir David Lyndsay of the Mount (c. 1490 – c. 1555), Scottish Lord Lyon and poet
Sandford Lyne (1945–2007), US poet, educator and editor
George Lyttelton (1709–1773), English poet, statesman and arts patron

M

Ma
Thomas Babington Macaulay, 1st Baron Macaulay (1800–1859), Anglo-Scottish poet and historian
George MacBeth (1932–1992), Scottish poet and novelist
Norman MacCaig (1910–1996), Scottish poet
Elizabeth Roberts MacDonald (1864–1922), Canadian poet and writer
Hugh MacDiarmid (1892–1978), Scottish poet
George MacDonald (1824–1905), Scottish poet and novelist
Sorley MacLean (1911–1996), Scottish Gaelic poet
Gwendolyn MacEwen (1941–1987), Canadian writer and poet
Antonio Machado (1875–1939), Spanish poet
Arthur Machen (1863–1947), Welsh author and mystic
Compton Mackenzie (1883–1972), Scottish writer, memoirist and poet
Archibald MacLeish (1892–1987), US modernist poet and writer
Aonghas MacNeacail (born 1942), writer in Scottish Gaelic
Louis MacNeice (1907–1963), Irish poet and playwright
Hector Macneill (1746–1818), Scottish poet and songwriter
James Macpherson (1736–1796), Scottish writer and poet
Haki R. Madhubuti (born 1942), African-US writer, poet and educator
Jayanta Mahapatra (born 1928), Indian English poet
John Gillespie Magee, Jr. (1922–1941), US poet and aviator
Eric Magrane (born 1975), US poet and geographer 
Derek Mahon (1941–2020), Northern Irish poet
Rudolf Maister (1874–1934), Slovene poet and activist
Gajanan Digambar Madgulkar (1919–1977), Marathi and Hindi poet and playwright
János Majláth (1786–1855), Hungarian historian and poet
Clarence Major (born 1936), US poet, painter and novelist
Desanka Maksimović (1898–1993), Serbian poet and professor
Majeed Amjad (1914–1974), Indian/Pakistani poet in Urdu
Antoni Malczewski (1793–1826), Polish poet
Marcin Malek (born 1975), Polish poet, writer and playwright
Josh Malihabadi (born Shabbir Hasan Khan) (1898–1982), Indian Urdu poet
Madayyagari Mallana (fl. 15th c.), Telugu poet
Stephane Mallarme (1842–1898), French poet and critic
David Mallet (c. 1705–1765), Scottish dramatist and poet
Thomas Malory (1405–1471), English author of Le Morte d'Arthur
Goffredo Mameli (1827–1849), Italian patriot, poet and writer
Osip Mandelstam (also Mandelshtam, 1891–1938), Russian poet
James Clarence Mangan (1803–1849), Irish poet
Bill Manhire (born 1946), New Zealand poet and fiction writer; New Zealand Poet Laureate
Marcus Manilius (fl. 1st c. CE), Roman poet and astrologer
Maurice Manning (born 1966), US poet
Ruth Manning-Sanders (1895–1988), Welsh-born English poet and author
Robert Mannyng (1275–1340), English chronicler and monk in Middle English, French and Latin
Chris Mansell (born 1953), Australian poet and publisher
Jakobe Mansztajn (born 1982), Polish poet and blogger
Manuchehri (Abu Najm Ahmad ibn Ahmad ibn Qaus Manuchehri; 11th c.), royal poet in Persia
Alessandro Manzoni (1785–1873), Italian poet and novelist
Sándor Márai (1900–1989), Hungarian/US poet and novelist
Ausiàs March (1397–1459), Valencian poet and knight
Morton Marcus (1936–2009), US poet and author
Mareez (1917–1983), Indian poet in Gujarati
Paul Mariani (born 1940), US poet and academic
Marie de France (fl. 12th c.), poet probably French-born and resident in England
Filippo Tommaso Marinetti (1876–1944), Italian poet and editor
Giambattista Marino (1569–1625), Italian poet
E. A. Markham (1939–2008), Montserrat poet, playwright and novelist
Edwin Markham (1852–1940), US poet
Đorđe Marković Koder (1806–1891), Serbian poet
Christopher Marlowe (1564–1593), English dramatist, poet and translator
Clément Marot (1496–1544), French Renaissance poet
Don Marquis (1878–1937), US novelist, poet and playwright
Edward Garrard Marsh (1783–1862), English poet and cleric
John Marston (1576–1634), English playwright, poet and satirist
José Martí (1853–1895), Cuban poet and writer
Martial (40 – c. 102 CE), Roman epigrammatist
Camille Martin (born 1956), Canadian poet and collage artist
Harry Martinson (1904–1978), Swedish sailor, author and poet
Andrew Marvell (1621–1678), English metaphysical poet and politician
John Masefield (1878–1967), English poet and writer; UK Poet Laureate (1930–1967)
Edgar Lee Masters (1868–1950), US poet, biographer and dramatist
Dafydd Llwyd Mathau (fl. earlier 17th c.), Welsh poet in Welsh
János Mattis-Teutsch (1884–1960), Hungarian-Romanian poet and artist
Glyn Maxwell (born 1962), British poet, playwright and librettist
Vladimir Mayakovsky (1893–1930), Russian/Soviet poet and playwright
Karl May (1842–1912), German writer, poet and musician
Bernadette Mayer (born 1945), US poet and prose writer
Ben Mazer (born 1964), US poet and editor

Mc–Me
James McAuley (1917–1976), Australian poet and critic
Susan McCaslin (born 1947), Canadian/US poet and critic
J. D. McClatchy (1945–2018), US poet and critic
Michael McClure (1932–2020), US poet, playwright and novelist
John McCrae (1872–1918), Canadian poet, physician and artist
Walt McDonald (1934–2022), US poet; Poet Laureate of Texas
Dermit McEncroe (fl. early 18th-century), Irish doctor and poet
Elvis McGonagall, Scottish poet and comedian
William Topaz McGonagall (1825–1902), Scottish writer of doggerel
Roger McGough (born 1937), English comedian and poet
Campbell McGrath (born 1962), US poet
Wendy McGrath, Canadian poet and novelist
Thomas McGrath (1916–1990), US poet
Heather McHugh (born 1948), US poet, translator and educator
Duncan Ban McIntyre (1724–1812), Scottish poet in Scottish Gaelic
James McIntyre (1827–1906), Canadian writer of doggerel
Claude McKay (1889–1948), Jamaican-US writer and poet
Don McKay (born 1942), Canadian poet, editor and educator
Rod McKuen (1933–2015), US poet, composer and singer
James McMichael (born 1939), US poet
Ian McMillan (born 1956), English poet, playwright and broadcaster
Meera (1498–1546), Indian Hindu mystic poet and Krishna devotee
Narsinh Mehta (c. 1414 – c. 1481), Indian poet-saint of Gujarat
Mei Yaochen (1002–1060), Chinese Song dynasty poet
Peter Meinke (born 1932), US poet and fiction writer
Cecília Meireles (1901–1964), Brazilian poet
Herman Melville (1819–1891), US fiction writer and poet
Meng Haoran (689 or 691–740), Chinese Tang dynasty poet
George Meredith (1828–1909), English poet and novelist
Kersti Merilaas (1913–1986), Estonian poet
Alda Merini (1931–2009) Italian writer and poet
Stuart Merrill (1863–1915), US poet writing mainly in French
James Merrill (1926–1995), US poet; 1977 Pulitzer Prize for Poetry
Thomas Merton (1915–1968), US writer and Trappist monk
W. S. Merwin (1927–2019), US poet and author; 1971 and 2009 Pulitzer Prize for Poetry; 2010 US Poet Laureate
Sarah Messer (born 1966), US poet and writer
Charlotte Mew (1869–1928), English poet
Henry Meyer (1840–1925), US poet writing in Pennsylvania Dutch
Ferenc Mező (1885–1961), Hungarian poet

Mi–Mo

Henri Michaux (1899–1984), Belgian/French poet, writer and painter
Michelangelo di Lodovico Buonarroti Simoni (1475–1564), Italian poet and sculptor
Tadeusz Miciński (1873–1918), Polish poet and playwright
Adam Mickiewicz (1798–1855), Polish poet, essayist and publicist
Veronica Micle (1850–1889), Austrian/Romanian poet
Christopher Middleton (c. 1560–1628), English poet and translator
Christopher Middleton (c. 1690–1770), Royal Navy officer and navigator
Christopher Middleton (1926–2015), English poet
Thomas Middleton (1580–1627), English poet and playwright
Agnes Miegel (1879–1964), German writer and poet
Josephine Miles (1911–1985), US poet and critic
Jennifer Militello, US poet and professor
Branko Miljković (1934–1961), Serbian poet
Edna St. Vincent Millay (1892–1950), US lyric poet, playwright and feminist
Alice Duer Miller (1874–1942), US writer and poet
Grazyna Miller (1957–2009), Italian/Polish poet and translator
Jace Miller, US poet
Jane Miller (born 1949), US poet
Joaquin Miller (1837–1913), US poet
Leslie Adrienne Miller (born 1956), US poet
Thomas Miller (1807–1874), English poet
Vassar Miller (1924–1998), US writer and poet
Spike Milligan (1918–2002), Irish comedian, poet and musician
Czesław Miłosz (1911–2004), Polish poet; 1980 Nobel Prize in Literature
John Milton (1608–1674), English poet and polemicist
Sima Milutinović Sarajlija (1791–1847), Serbian adventurer, writer and poet
Marijane Minaberri (1926–2017), French/Basque poet and radio broadcaster
Robert Minhinnick (born 1952), Welsh poet, essayist and novelist
Matthew Minicucci (born 1981), US poet and teacher
Mir Taqi Mir (1725–1810), Indian poet in Urdu
Gabriela Mistral (1889–1957), Chilean poet and feminist; 1945 Nobel Prize in Literature
Adrian Mitchell (1932–2008), English poet, novelist and playwright.
Silas Weir Mitchell (1829–1914), US physician and writer
Stephen Mitchell (born 1943) US poet, translator and anthologist
Waddie Mitchell (born 1950), US poet
Ndre Mjeda (1866–1937), Albanian Gheg poet
Stanisław Młodożeniec (1895–1959), poet
Anis Mojgani (born 1977), US spoken-word poet and visual artist
Molière (Jean-Baptiste Poquelin) (1622–1673), French playwright
Atukuri Molla (1440–1530), Indian Telugu poet
Harold Monro (1879–1932), English poet
Harriet Monroe (1860–1936), US scholar, critic and poet
John Montague (1929–2016), Irish poet
Charles Montagu, 1st Earl of Halifax (1661–1715), English poet and statesman
Eugenio Montale (1896–1981), Italian poet, writer and translator; 1975 Nobel Prize in Literature
Lenore Montanaro (born 1990), US poet
Alexander Montgomerie (c. 1550–1598), Scottish Jacobean courtier and makar
Alan Moore (born 1960), Irish writer and poet
Marianne Moore (1887–1972), US poet and writer
Merrill Moore (1903–1957), US psychiatrist and poet
Thomas Moore (1779–1852), Irish poet, singer and songwriter
Dom Moraes (1938–2004), Goan writer, poet and columnist
Kelly Ana Morey (born 1968), New Zealand novelist and poet
Edwin Morgan (1920–2010), Scottish poet and translator
J. O. Morgan (born 1978), Scottish poet
John Morgan (1688–1733), Welsh clergyman, scholar and poet
Lorin Morgan-Richards (born 1975), US poet and author 
Christian Morgenstern (1871–1914), German author and poet
Eduard Mörike (1804–1875), German poet
William Morris (1834–1896), English writer, poet and designer
Jim Morrison (1943–1971), US songwriter and poet
Jan Andrzej Morsztyn (1621–1693), Polish poet
Zbigniew Morsztyn (c. 1628–1689), Polish poet
Valzhyna Mort (born 1981), Belarus poet
Viggo Mortensen (born 1958), US poet, actor and musician
Moschus (fl. 2nd c. BCE), Greek bucolic poet
Howard Moss (1922–1987), US poet, dramatist and critic
Andrew Motion (born 1952), English poet, novelist and biographer; Poet Laureate of the United Kingdom 1999–2009
Enrique Moya (born 1958), Venezuelan poet, fiction writer and critic

Mu–My
Micere Githae Mugo (born 1942), Kenyan playwright, author and poet
Erich Mühsam (1878–1934), German-Jewish essayist, poet and, playwright
Edwin Muir (1887–1959), Scottish Orcadian poet, novelist and translator
Paul Muldoon (born 1951), Irish poet
Lale Müldür (born 1956), Turkish poet and writer
Laura Mullen (born 1958), US poet
Anthony Munday (1553–1633), English playwright and writer
George Murnu (1868–1957), Romanian archeologist, historian and poet
Sheila Murphy (born 1951), US text and visual poet
George Murray (born 1971), Canadian poet
Joan Murray (born 1945), US poet, writer and playwright
Les Murray (1938–2019), Australian poet, anthologist and critic
Richard Murphy (1927–2018), Irish poet
Susan Musgrave (born 1951), Canadian poet and children's writer
Lukijan Mušicki (1777–1837), Serbian poet, prose writer and polyglot
Nikola Musulin (fl. 19th c.), Serbian poet
Togara Muzanenhamo (born 1975), Zimbabwean poet
Christopher Mwashinga (born 1965), Tanzanian poet, author and Christian minister
Lam Quang My (born 1944), Vietnamese poet in Polish and Vietnamese

N
Vladimir Nabokov (1899–1977), Russian novelist and poet in Russian and English
Daniel Naborowski (1573–1640), Polish poet
Ágnes Nemes Nagy (1922–1991), Hungarian poet and translator
Gáspár Nagy (1949–2007), Hungarian poet
Lajos Parti Nagy (born 1953), Hungarian poet, playwright and critic
László Nagy (1925–1978), Hungarian poet and translator
Guru Nanak Dev (1469–1539), first Sikh Guru and Punjabi poet
Nannaya (c. 11th c.), earliest known Telugu author
Philip Nanton (living), Vincentian poet
Adam Naruszewicz (1733–1796), Polish-Lithuanian poet, historian and dramatist
Ogden Nash (1902–1971), US poet known for light verse
Thomas Nashe (1567–1601), English playwright, poet and satirist
Imadaddin Nasimi (died c. 1417), Azerbaijani poet
Momčilo Nastasijević (1894–1938), Serbian poet, novelist and dramatist
Natsume Sōseki (1867–1916), Japanese novelist and poet
Gellu Naum (1915–2001), Romanian poet, dramatist and children's writer
Nedîm (c. 1681–1730), Ottoman poet
John Neal (1793–1876), US writer, critic, activist and poet
Henry Neele (1798–1828), English poet and scholar
John Neihardt (1881–1973), US poet, historian and ethnographer
Émile Nelligan (1879–1941), Quebec poet
Marilyn Nelson (born 1946), US poet, translator and children's writer
Howard Nemerov (1920–1991), US poet; US Poet Laureate 1963–1964
István Péter Németh (born 1960), Hungarian poet and literary historian
Condetto Nénékhaly-Camara (1930–1972), Guinean poet and playwright
Jan Neruda (1834–1891), Czech journalist, writer and poet
Pablo Neruda (1904–1973), Chilean poet and politician; Nobel Prize for Literature 1971
Neşâtî (died 1674), Ottoman Sufi poet
Henry John Newbolt (1862–1938), English historian and poet
John Henry Newman (1801–1890), writer, poet and hymnist
Aimee Nezhukumatathil (born 1974), Asian US poet
Nguyễn Du (1766–1820), Vietnamese poet in ancient Chữ Nôm script
B. P. Nichol (bpNichol, 1944–1988), Canadian poet
Nicholas I of Montenegro (1841–1921), poet and king of Montenegro
Grace Nichols (born 1950), Guyanese poet
Norman Nicholson (1914–1987), English poet
Lorine Niedecker (1903–1970), US poet
Julian Ursyn Niemcewicz (1758–1841), Polish poet, playwright and statesman
Friedrich Nietzsche (1844–1900), German philosopher, poet and philologist
Millosh Gjergj Nikolla (Migjeni) (1911–1938), Albanian poet and writer
Nisami (1141–1209), Persian poet
Nishiyama Sōin (1605–1682), Japanese haikai poet
Moeen Nizami (born 1965), Pakistani poet, scholar and writer
Petar II Petrović-Njegoš (1813–1851), Serbian poet, playwright and prince-bishop
Yamilka Noa (born 1980), Cuban–Costa Rican poet
Gábor Nógrádi (born 1947), Hungarian poet, essayist and children's novelist
Christopher Nolan (1965–2009), Irish poet and author
Fan S. Noli (1882–1965), Albanian/US writer, diplomat and historian
Olga Nolla (1938–2001), Puerto Rican poet, writer and professor
Harry Northup (born 1940), US actor and poet
Caroline Norton (1808–1877), English writer, feminist and reformer
Cyprian Norwid (1821–1883), Polish poet, dramatist and artist
Alice Notley (born 1945), US poet
Novalis (Friedrich von Hardenberg) (1772–1801), German poet and novelist
Franciszek Nowicki (1864–1935), Polish poet and conservationist
Alfred Noyes (1880–1958), English poet
Oodgeroo Noonuccal (1920–1993), first Aboriginal Australian published poet
Julia Nyberg (1784–1854), Swedish poet and songwriter
Naomi Shihab Nye (born 1952), Palestinian-US poet, songwriter and novelist
Robert Nye (1939–2016), English poet, novelist and children's writer
Niyi Osundare (born 1947), Nigerian poet, dramatist and literary critic

O
Dositej Obradović (1742–1811), Serbian philosopher, writer and poet
Sean O'Brien (born 1952), British poet, critic and playwright
 D. Michael O'Connor aka Damond Jiniya(Born 1974), North American singer, writer and poet
Philip O'Connor (1916–1998), Anglo-French writer and poet
Antoni Edward Odyniec (1804–1885), Polish poet
Ron Offen (1930–2010), US poet, playwright and producer
Dennis O'Driscoll (1954–2012), Irish poet
Frank O'Hara (1926–1966), US writer, poet and art critic
Hisashi Okuyama (born 1941), Japanese poet
Sharon Olds (born 1942), US poet
Mary Oliver (1935–2015), US poet
Charles Olson (1910–1970), US modernist poet
Saishu Onoe (1876–1957), Japanese poet
Onomacritus (c. 530–480 BCE), Attic poet, priest and seer
George Oppen (1908–1984), US poet
Artur Oppman (Or-Ot, 1867–1931), Polish poet
Edward Otho Cresap Ord, II (1858–1923), US poet and painter
Zaharije Orfelin (1726–1785), Serbian polymath and poet
Władysław Orkan (1875–1930), Polish poet
Peter Orlovsky (1933–2010), US poet and actor; partner of Allen Ginsberg
Gregory Orr (born 1947), US poet
Agnieszka Osiecka (1936–1997), Polish poet, writer and screenplay author
Alice Oswald (born 1966), English poet
Ouyang Xiu (1007–1072), Chinese Song Dynasty historian, essayist and poet
Ovid (43 BCE – 17 CE), Roman poet
Wilfred Owen (1893–1918), English poet and soldier
İsmet Özel (born 1944), Turkish poet and scholar

P

Pa

Ruth Padel (born 1946), English poet, author and critic
Ron Padgett (born 1942), US poet, writer and translator
Dan Pagis (1930–1986), Israeli poet and Holocaust survivor
Grace Paley (1922–2007), US short story writer and poet
Francis Turner Palgrave (1824–1897), English critic and poet
Palladas (fl. 4th c.), Greek poet
Michael Palmer (born 1943), US poet and translator
Sima Pandurović (1883–1960), Serbian poet
Sumitranandan Pant (1900–1977), Indian poet in Hindi
Daniele Pantano (born 1976), Swiss poet, translator, editor and scholar
William Williams Pantycelyn (1717–1791), Welsh poet and hymnist in Welsh
Park Yong-rae (1925–1980), Korean poet
Dorothy Parker (1893–1967), US poet, fiction writer and satirist
Amy Parkinson (1855–1938), British-born Canadian poet
Thomas Parnell (1679–1718), Irish poet and clergyman
Nicanor Parra (1914–2018), Chilean mathematician and poet
Giovanni Pascoli (1855–1912), Italian poet
Ámbar Past (born 1949), Mexican poet, visual artist
Boris Pasternak (1890–1960), Russian poet, novelist and translator
Leon Pasternak (1910–1969), Polish poet and satirist
Benito Pastoriza Iyodo (born 1954), Puerto Rican poet and fiction and literature writer
Kenneth Patchen (1911–1972), US poet and novelist
Ravji Patel (1939–1968), Indian poet
Banjo Paterson (Andrew Barton Paterson) (1864–1941), Australian bush poet, journalist and author
Don Paterson (born 1963), Scottish poet, writer and musician
Coventry Patmore (1823–1896), English poet and critic
Brian Patten (born 1946), English poet
Lekhnath Paudyal (1885–1966), Nepalese poet
Paul I, Prince Esterházy (1635–1713) Austro-Hungarian poet
Cesare Pavese (1908–1950), Italian poet, novelist and critic
Maria Pawlikowska-Jasnorzewska (1891–1945), Polish poet and dramatist
Octavio Paz (1914–1998), Mexican writer, poet and diplomat

Pe–Pl
Thomas Love Peacock (1785–1866), English poet and novelist
Patrick Pearse (1879–1916), Irish poet and writer
James Larkin Pearson (1879–1981), US poet and publisher
Allasani Peddana (fl. 15th/16th cc.), Telugu poet
Charles Péguy (1873–1914), French poet, essayist and editor
Kathleen Peirce (born 1956), US poet
Gabino Coria Peñaloza (1881–1975), Argentine poet and lyricist
Sam Pereira (living), US poet
Lucia Perillo (1958–2016), US poet
Persius (34–62 CE), Roman poet and satirist of Etruscan origin
Fernando Pessoa (1888–1935), Portuguese poet, philosopher and critic
Lenrie Peters (1932–2009), Gambian surgeon, novelist, poet and educationist
Robert Peters (1924–2014), US poet, scholar and playwright
Pascale Petit (born 1953), French-Welsh poet and artist
Petrarch (Francesco Petrarca) (1304–1374), Italian scholar and poet
Kata Szidónia Petrőczy (1659–1708), Hungarian poet and prose writer
Marine Petrossian (born 1960), Armenian poet, essayist and columnist
Veljko Petrović (1884–1967), Serbian poet, prose writer and theorist
Mirko Petrović-Njegoš (1820–1867), Serbian and Montenegrin poet, soldier and diplomat
Mario Petrucci (born 1958), English poet, author and translator of Italian origin
Ambrose Philips (1674–1749), English poet and politician
Katherine Philips (1632–1664), Anglo-Welsh poet
Savitribai Phule (1831–1897), Indian social reformer, educationalist, and poet from Maharashtra
Pi Rixiu (c. 834–883), Tang Dynasty poet
Tom Pickard (born 1946), English poet and film maker
Pindar (522–443 BCE), Theban lyric poet in Greek
Robert Pinsky (born 1940), US poet, critic and translator; 1997–2000 US Poet Laureate
Ruth Pitter (1897–1992), English poet
Christine de Pizan (c. 1365 – c. 1430), Venetian historian, poet and philosopher
Sylvia Plath (1932–1963), US poet and novelist
William Plomer (1903–1973), South African novelist, poet and editor in English

Po–Pu
Jacek Podsiadło (born 1964), Polish poet, translator and essayist
Edgar Allan Poe (1809–1849), US author, poet and critic
Suman Pokhrel (born 1967), Nepalese poet, playwright and artist
Wincenty Pol (1807–1872), Polish poet and geographer
Margaret Steuart Pollard (1904–1996), English poet
Edward Pollock (1823–1858), US poet
John Pomfret (1667–1702), English poet and clergyman.
Marie Ponsot (1921–2019), US poet, critic and essayist
Vasko Popa (1922–1991), Serbian poet of Romanian descent
Alexander Pope (1688–1744), English poet
Antonio Porchia (1885–1968), Italian Argentinian poet
Judith Pordon (born 1954), US poet, writer and editor
Peter Porter (1929–2010), Australian poet based in England
Halina Poświatowska (1935–1967), Polish poet and writer
Roma Potiki (born 1958), New Zealand poet and playwright
Wacław Potocki (1621–1696), Polish poet and moralist
Ezra Pound (1885–1972), US expatriate poet and critic
Alishetty Prabhakar (1952–1993), Telugu poet
Tapan Kumar Pradhan (born 1972), Indian poet, translator and activist
Adélia Prado (born 1935), Brazilian writer and poet
Winthrop Mackworth Praed (1802–1839), English politician and poet
Jaishankar Prasad (1889–1937), Indian poet in Hindi
E. J. Pratt (1882–1964), Canadian poet
Petar Preradović (1818–1872), Croatian poet, writer and general
France Prešeren (1800–1849), Carniolan Romantic poet
Jacques Prévert (1900–1977), French poet and screenwriter
Richard Price (born 1966), Scottish poet, novelist and translator
Robert Priest (born 1951), English-born Canadian poet, children's author and singer/songwriter
F. T. Prince (1912–2003), English poet and academic
Matthew Prior (1664–1721), English poet and diplomat
Bryan Procter (1787–1874), English poet
Sextus Propertius (50 or 45–15 BCE), Latin elegiac poet
Kevin Prufer (born 1969), US poet, academic and essayist
J. H. Prynne (born 1936), English poet
Kazimierz Przerwa-Tetmajer (1865–1940), Polish poet, novelist and playwright
Zenon Przesmycki (Miriam, 1861–1944), Polish poet, translator and critic
Jeremi Przybora (1915–2004), Polish poet, writer and singer
Luigi Pulci (1432–1484), Italian poet known for Morgante
Alexander Pushkin (1799–1837), Russian poet, novelist and playwright

Q
Nizar Qabbani (1923–1998), Syrian diplomat, poet and publisher
Muhammad Tahir ul-Qadri (born 1951), Pakistani Sufi poet and scholar
Sayyid Ahmedullah Qadri (1909–1985), Indian poet, writer and politician
Aref Qazvini (1882–1934), Iranian poet, lyricist and musician
Qu Yuan (343–278 BCE), Chinese poet
Francis Quarles (1592–1644), English Christian poet
Salvatore Quasimodo (1901–1968), Italian author and poet; 1959 Nobel Prize in Literature

R

Ra–Re
Jean Racine (1639–1699), French dramatist
Branko Radičević (1824–1853), Serbian lyric poet
Leetile Disang Raditladi (1910–1971) poet from Botswana
Sam Ragan (1915–1996), US poet, journalist and writer
Shamsur Rahman (1929–2006), Bangladeshi poet and columnist
Craig Raine (born 1944), English poet
Kathleen Raine (1908–2003), English poet, critic and scholar
Samina Raja (born 1961), Pakistani poet, writer and broadcaster
Milan Rakić (1876–1938), Serbian poet
Carl Rakosi (1903–2004), US Objectivist poet
Martin Rakovský (c. 1535–1579), Hungarian poet and scholar
Zsuzsa Rakovszky (born 1950), Hungarian poet and translator
Maraea Rakuraku (living), New Zealand Māori poet, playwright and short story writer
Sir Walter Raleigh (c. 1554–1618), English writer, poet and explorer
Tenali Rama (16th c., CE), Telugu poet
Ayyalaraju Ramabhadrudu (16th c., CE), Telugu poet
Ramarajabhushanudu (mid 16th c. CE), Telugu poet and musician
Guru Ram Das (1534–1581), Sikh guru and Punjabi poet
Simón Darío Ramírez (1930–1992), Venezuelan poet
Allan Ramsay (1686–1758), Scottish poet, playwright and publisher
Dudley Randall (1914–2000), African-US poet and publisher
Thomas Randolph (1605–1635), English poet and dramatist
John Crowe Ransom (1888–1974), US poet, essayist and editor
Addepalli Ramamohana Rao (1936–2016), Telugu poet and literary critic
Ágnes Rapai (born 1952), Hungarian poet, writer and translator
Noon Meem Rashid (1910–1975), Pakistani poet writing in Urdu
Stephen Ratcliffe (born 1948), US poet and critic
Dahlia Ravikovitch (1936–2005), Israeli poet and translator
Tom Raworth (1938–2017), British poet and visual artist
Herbert Read (1893–1968), English anarchist, poet and arts critic
Peter Reading (1946–2011), English poet
Angela Readman (born 1973), English poet
James Reaney (1926–2008), Canadian poet, playwright and professor
Malliya Rechana (mid-10th c. CE), Telugu poet
Peter Redgrove (1932–2003), English poet
Beatrice Redpath (1886–1937), Canadian poet and short story writer
Henry Reed (1914–1986), English poet, translator and radio dramatist
Ishmael Reed (born 1938), US poet, playwright and novelist
Ennis Rees (1925–2009), US poet, professor and translator
James Reeves (1909–1978), English poet, children's writer and writer on song
Abraham Regelson (1896–1981), Israeli Hebrew poet, author and children's author
Christopher Reid (born 1949), Hong Kong-born English poet, essayist and cartoonist
James Reiss (1941–2016), US poet
Mikołaj Rej (1505–1569), Polish poet and prose writer
Robert Rendall (1898–1967), Orkney Scottish poet and amateur naturalist
Pierre Reverdy (1889–1960), French poet of Surrealism, Dadaism and Cubism
Jacobus Revius (born Jakob Reefsen) (1586–1658), Dutch poet, theologian and church historian
Kenneth Rexroth (1905–1982), US poet, translator and critical essayist
Sydor Rey (1908–1979), Polish poet and novelist
Charles Reznikoff (1894–1976), US Objectivist poet
Raees Warsi (born 1963), Pakistani poet, writer and lyricist writing in Urdu

Ri–Ry
Francisco Granizo Ribadeneira (1925–2009), Ecuadorian poet
Anne Rice (1941–2021), US fiction writer
Stan Rice (1943–2002), US poet and artist; husband of Anne Rice
Adrienne Rich (1929–2012), US poet, essayist and feminist
John Richardson (1817–1886), English Lake District poet
Edgell Rickword (1898–1982), English poet, critic and journalist
Lola Ridge (1873–1941), Irish-born US anarchist poet and editor
Laura Riding (1901–1981), US poet, critic and novelist
Anne Ridler (1912–2001), English poet and editor
James Whitcomb Riley (1849–1916), US writer and poet
John Riley (1937–1978), English poet of British Poetry Revival
Rainer Maria Rilke (1875–1926), Bohemian-Austrian poet
Gopal Prasad Rimal (1918–1973), Nepali poet and playwright
Arthur Rimbaud (1854–1891), French symbolist poet of Decadent movement
Alberto Ríos (born 1952), US poet and professor
Khawar Rizvi (1938–1981), Pakistani poet and scholar in Urdu and Persian
Emma Roberts (1794–1840), English travel writer and poet
Michael Roberts (1902–1948), English poet, writer and editor
Edwin Arlington Robinson (1869–1935), US poet
Mary Robinson (1757–1800), English poet and novelist
Peter Robinson (born 1953), English poet
Roland Robinson (1912–1992), Australian poet and writer
Georges Rodenbach (1855–1898), Belgian Symbolist poet and novelist
W R Rodgers (1909–1969), Northern Irish poet, essayist and Presbyterian minister
José Luis Rodríguez Pittí (born 1971), Panamanian poet and artist
Theodore Roethke (1908–1963), US poet
Samuel Rogers (1763–1855), English poet
Rognvald Kali Kolsson (c. 1103–1158), Earl of Orkney and saint
Matthew Rohrer (born 1970), US poet
Géza Röhrig (born 1967), Hungarian poet and actor
Radoslav Rochallyi (born 1980), Slovak writer
David Romtvedt (living), US poet
Pierre de Ronsard (1524–1585), French poet
Peter Rosegger (1843–1918), Austrian poet
Franklin Rosemont (1943–2009), US poet, artist and co-founder of Chicago Surrealist Group
Penelope Rosemont (born 1942), US poet, writer and co-founder of Chicago Surrealist Group
Michael Rosen (born 1946) UK children's poet and former children's poet laureate
Isaac Rosenberg (1890–1918), English poet
Barbara Rosiek (1959–2020), Polish poet, writer and psychologist
Alan Ross (1922–2001), English poet, cricket writer and editor
Christina Rossetti (1830–1894), English poet
Dante Gabriel Rossetti (1828–1882), English poet, illustrator and painter
Andrus Rõuk (born 1957), Estonian artist and poet
Raymond Roussel (1877–1933), French poet, novelist and playwright
Nicholas Rowe (1674–1718), English dramatist, poet and miscellanist; UK Poet Laureate 1715
Samuel Rowlands (c. 1573–1630), English poet and pamphleteer
Susanna Roxman (1946–2015), English poet born in Sweden
Istvan Rozanich (1912–1984), Hungarian poet exiled in Venezuela
Tadeusz Różewicz (1921–2014), Polish poet and writer
Ljubivoje Ršumović (born 1939), Serbian poet
Friedrich Rückert (1788–1866), German poet, translator and academic
Muriel Rukeyser (1913–1980), US poet and political activist
Zygmunt Rumel (1915–1943), Polish poet and partisan
Jalāl ad-Dīn Muhammad Rumi (1207–1273), Persian Muslim poet, jurist and Sufi mystic
Paul-Eerik Rummo (born 1942), Estonian poet
Johan Ludvig Runeberg (1804–1877), Finnish poet in Swedish
Nipsey Russell (1918–2005), US poet and comedian
Lucjan Rydel (1870–1918), Polish poet and playwright
Jarosław Marek Rymkiewicz (1935–2022), Polish poet, essayist and dramatist
Ryōkan (1758–1831), Japanese calligrapher and poet

S

Sa–Se

Umberto Saba (1883–1957), Italian poet and novelist
Jaime Sabines (1926–1999), Mexican poet
Nelly Sachs (1891–1970), Jewish German poet and playwright; 1966 Nobel Prize in Literature
Charles Sackville, 6th Earl of Dorset and 1st Earl of Middlesex (1638–1706), English poet and courtier
Thomas Sackville, 1st Earl of Dorset (1536–1608), English statesman, poet and dramatist
Vita Sackville-West (1892–1962), English author, poet and gardener
Saʿdī Shīrāzī (1184–1283/1291), Persian poet
Benjamin Alire Sáenz (born 1954), US poet, novelist and children's writer
Ali Ahmad Said (Adunis) (born 1930), Syrian poet, essayist and translator
Mellin de Saint-Gelais (c. 1491–1558), French Renaissance poet
Akim Samar (1916–1943), Soviet poet and novelist seen as first Nanai language writer
Sonia Sanchez (born 1934), African-US poet associated with Black Arts Movement
Michal Šanda (born 1965), Czech writer and poet
Carl Sandburg (1878–1967), US poet, writer and editor; three Pulitzer Prizes
Jacopo Sannazaro (1458–1530), Italian poet, humanist and epigrammist from Naples
Ann Sansom, English poet and writing tutor
Aleksa Šantić (1868–1924), Bosnian Serb poet
Taneda Santōka (1882–1940), Japanese free verse haiku poet
Genrikh Sapgir (1928–1999), Russian poet and fiction writer
Sappho (c. 630–612 – c. 570 BCE), ancient Greek lyric poet from Lesbos
Jaydeep Sarangi (born 1973), Indian poet in English
Maciej Kazimierz Sarbiewski (1595–1640), Polish poet in Latin
William Saroyan (1908–1981), US author of Armenian descent
Siegfried Sassoon (1886–1967), English war poet
Subagio Sastrowardoyo (1924–1995), Indonesian poet, fiction writer and literary critic
Satsvarupa Das Goswami (born 1939), US poet and artist
William Saunders (1806–1851), Welsh poet in Welsh
Richard Savage (c. 1697–1743), English poet
Leslie Scalapino (1944–2010), US poet, writer and playwright
Maurice Scève (c. 1500–1564), French poet
Hermann Georg Scheffauer (1876–1927), US poet, architect and fiction writer
Georges Schehadé (1905–1989), Lebanese playwright and poet in French
Friedrich Schiller (1759–1805), German poet, philosopher and playwright
Arno Schmidt (1914–1979), German author and translator
Dennis Schmitz (1937–2019), US poet
Johanna Schouten-Elsenhout (1910–1992), Surinamese poet and community leader, wrote in Sranan Tongo and English
Arthur Schnitzler (1862–1931), Austrian author and dramatist
Anton Schosser (1801–1849), Austrian dialect poet
Philip Schultz (born 1945), US poet
James Schuyler (1923–1991), US poet
Delmore Schwartz (1913–1966), US poet and fiction writer
Alexander Scott (c. 1520–1582/1583), Scottish poet
Alexander Scott (1920–1989), Scottish poet and playwright
Frederick George Scott (1861–1944), Canadian poet and author, father of F. R. Scott
F. R. Scott (1899–1985), Canadian poet, academic and constitutional expert
Tom Scott (1918–1995), Scottish poet
Sir Walter Scott (1771–1832), Scottish historical novelist, playwright and poet
Gil Scott-Heron (1949–2011), US soul musician and jazz poet
George Bazeley Scurfield (1920–1991), English poet, novelist, author and politician
Peter Seaton (1942–2010), US Language poet
Władysław Sebyła (1902–1940), Polish poet
Johannes Secundus (1511–1536), Dutch Neo-Latin poet
Sir Charles Sedley, 5th Baronet (1639–1701), English poet, wit and dramatist
George Seferis (pen name of Geōrgios Seferiádēs) (1900–1971), Greek poet and Nobel laureate
Hugh Seidman (born 1940), US poet
Rebecca Seiferle (living), US poet
Jaroslav Seifert (1901–1986), Czech writer, poet and journalist; 1984 Nobel Prize in Literature
Lasana M. Sekou (born 1959), Sint Maarten poet, essayist and journalist
Semonides of Amorgos (c. 7th c. BCE), Greek iambic and elegiac poet
Léopold Sédar Senghor (1906–2001), Senegalese poet, politician and cultural theorist
Robert W. Service (1874–1958), Scottish-Canadian poet
Vikram Seth (born 1952), Indian author and poet
Anne Sexton (1928–1974), US poet; Confessional poetry, 1967 Pulitzer Prize for Poetry
John W. Sexton (born 1958), Irish poet, fiction and children's writer

Sh–Sj
Thomas Shadwell (c. 1642–1692), English poet and playwright; Poet Laureate of the United Kingdom, 1689–1692
Muhammad Quli Qutb Shah (1565–1612), sultan of Golkonda and poet in Persian, Telugu and Urdu 
Riaz Ahmed Gohar Shahi (1941–2001), Pakistani Sufi spiritual leader, poet and author
Parveen Shakir (1952–1994) Pakistani poet, teacher and a civil servant of the government of Pakistan
William Shakespeare (c. 1564–1616), English poet and playwright
Tupac Shakur (1971–1996), US rapper, actor and black activist
Otep Shamaya (born 1979), US singer-songwriter, actress and poet
Ahmad Shamlou (1925–2000), Iranian poet 
Paata Shamugia (born 1983), Georgian poet
Ntozake Shange (1948–2018), US playwright and poet
Jo Shapcott (born 1953), English poet, editor and lecturer
Karl Shapiro (1913–2000), US poet; US Poet Laureate, 1946–1947
Brenda Shaughnessy (born 1970), US poet
Luci Shaw (born 1928), English-born Christian poet
Percy Bysshe Shelley (1792–1822), English Romantic poet
William Shenstone (1714–1763), English poet
Bhupi Sherchan (1935–1989), Nepalese poet
Taras Shevchenko (1814–1861), Ukrainian poet and artist
Mustafa Sheykhoghlu (1340/1341 – 1410), Turkish poet and translator
Masaoka Shiki (1867–1902), Japanese author, poet and literary critic
Hovhannes Shiraz (1915–1984), Armenian poet
James Shirley (1596–1666), English dramatist
Avraham Shlonsky (1900–1973), Israeli poet and editor
Sir Philip Sidney (1554–1586), English poet, courtier and soldier
Eli Siegel (1902–1978), Latvian-US poet, critic and philosopher
Robert Siegel (1939–2012), US poet and novelist
August Silberstein (1827–1900), Austro-Hungarian poet and writer in German
Jon Silkin (1930–1997), English poet
Ron Silliman (born 1946), US poet of Language poetry
Shel Silverstein (1930–1999), US poet, musician and children's writer
Simeon Simev (born 1949), Macedonian poet, essayist and journalist
Charles Simic (born 1938), Serbian-US poet; US Poet Laureate, 2007–2008
Simonides of Ceos (c. 556–468 BCE), Greek lyric poet, born at Ioulis on Kea
Louis Simpson (1923–2012), Jamaican poet
Bennie Lee Sinclair (1939–2000), US poet, novelist and story writer; South Carolina Poet Laureate, 1986–2000
Burns Singer (1928–1964), US poet raised in Scotland
Marilyn Singer (born 1948), US children's writer and poet
Ervin Šinko (1898–1967), Croatian-Hungarian poet and prose writer
Lemn Sissay (born 1967), English author and broadcaster
Charles Hubert Sisson (1914–2003), English poet and translator
Edith Sitwell (1887–1964), English poet and critic; eldest of three literary Sitwells
Sjón (born 1962), Icelandic author and poet

Sk–Sp
Egill Skallagrímsson (c. 910 – c. 990), Viking Age poet, warrior and farmer, protagonist of Egil's Saga
John Skelton (1460–1529), English poet
Sasha Skenderija (born 1968), Bosnian-US poet
Ed Skoog (born 1971), US poet
Jan Stanisław Skorupski (born 1938), Polish poet, essayist and esperantist
Pencho Slaveykov (1866–1912), Bulgarian poet
Petko Slaveykov (1827–1895), Bulgarian poet, publicist and folklorist
Kenneth Slessor (1901–1971), Australian poet and journalist
Anton Martin Slomšek (1800–1862), Slovene bishop, author and culture advocate
Antoni Słonimski (1895–1976), Polish poet, playwright and artist
Michaël Slory (1935–2018), Surinamese poet in Sranan Tongo, also in English, Dutch and Spanish
Juliusz Słowacki (1809–1849), Polish Romantic poet
Boris Slutsky (1919–1986), Russian poet
Christopher Smart (1722–1771), English poet and playwright
Hristo Smirnenski (1898–1923), Bulgarian poet and writer
Bruce Smith (born 1946), US poet
Charlotte Smith (1749–1806), English Romantic poet and novelist
Clark Ashton Smith (1893–1961), US poet, sculptor and author
Margaret Smith (born 1958), US poet, musician and artist
Patti Smith (born 1946), US singer-songwriter, poet and visual artist
Stevie Smith (1902–1971), English poet and novelist
Sydney Goodsir Smith (1915–1975), Scottish poet in Braid Scots
Tracy K. Smith (born 1972), US poet
William Jay Smith (1918–2015), US poet; US Poet Laureate 1968–1970
Tobias Smollett (1721–1771), Scottish poet and author
William De Witt Snodgrass (1926–2009), US poet
Gary Snyder (born 1930), US poet, essayist and environmentalist
Edith Södergran (1892–1923), Finnish poet in Swedish
Sōgi (1421–1502), Japanese waka and renga poet
David Solway (born 1941), Canadian poet, educational theorist and travel writer
Marie-Ange Somdah (born 1959), Burkinabe poet and writer
William Somervile (1675–1742), English poet
Sophocles (c. 496–406 BCE), Athenian tragedian
Charles Sorley (1895–1915), English war poet
Gary Soto (born 1952), Mexican-US author and poet
William Soutar (1898–1943), Scottish poet in English and Braid Scots
Caroline Anne Southey (1786–1854), English poet
Robert Southey (1774–1843), English Romantic poet and UK Poet Laureate, 1813–1843
Robert Southwell (1561–1595), English Catholic Jesuit priest, poet and clandestine missionary
Wole Soyinka (born 1934), Nigerian poet and playwright and poet; 1986 Nobel Prize in Literature
Bernard Spencer (1909–1963), English poet, translator and editor
Stephen Spender (1909–1995), English poet, novelist. and essayist; US Poet Laureate 1965–66
Edmund Spenser (1552–1599), English poet

St–Sz
Edward Stachura (1937–1979), poet, prose writer and translator
Leopold Staff (1878–1957), Polish poet
William Stafford (1914–1993), US poet and pacifist; US Poet Laureate 1970–1971
A. E. Stallings (born 1968), US poet and translator
Jon Stallworthy (1935–2014), English academic, poet and literary critic
Harold Standish (1919–1972), Canadian poet and novelist
Nichita Stănescu (1933–1983), Romanian poet
Ann Stanford (1916–1987), US poet
Anna Stanisławska (1651–1701), Polish poet
George Starbuck (1931–1996), US neo-Formalist poet
Andrzej Stasiuk (born 1960), Polish poet and novelist
Statius (c. 45–96, CE), Roman poet
Christian Karlson Stead, ONZ, CBE (born 1932), New Zealand novelist, poet and critic
Stesichorus (c. 640–555 BCE), Greek lyric poet
Joseph Stefan (1835–1893), Carinthian Slovenes physicist, mathematician and poet in Austria
Stefan Stefanović (1807–1828), Serbian poet
Gertrude Stein (1874–1946), US modernist in prose and poetry
Eric Stenbock (1860–1895), Baltic German poet and writer of fantastic fiction
Mattie Stepanek (1990–2004), US poet and advocate
George Stepney (1663–1707), English poet and diplomat
Anatol Stern (1899–1968), Polish poet and art critic
Gerald Stern (1925–2022), US poet
Marinko Stevanović (born 1961), Bosnian poet
C. J. Stevens (1927–2021), US writer of poetry, fiction and biography
Wallace Stevens (1880–1955), US modernist poet
Robert Louis Stevenson (1850–1894), Scottish novelist, poet and travel writer
Margo Taft Stever, US poet
Trumbull Stickney (1874–1904), US classical scholar and poet
James Still (1906–2001), US poet, novelist and folklorist
Milica Stojadinović-Srpkinja (1828–1878), Serbian poet
Dejan Stojanović (born 1959), Serbian-US poet, writer and philosopher
Donna J. Stone (1933–1994), US poet and philanthropist
Ruth Stone (1915–2011), US poet, author and teacher
Lisa Gluskin Stonestreet (born 1968), US poet and editor
Edward Storer (1880–1944), English writer, translator and poet linked with Imagism
Theodor Storm (1817–1888), German writer and poet
Alfonsina Storni (1892–1938), Latin US Modernist poet
Mark Strand (1934–2014), Canadian-born US poet, essayist and translator; US Poet Laureate, 1990–1991
Botho Strauß (born 1944), German playwright, poet and novelist
Joseph Stroud (born 1943), US poet
Jesse Stuart (1907–1984), US writer of fiction and poetry
Jacquie Sturm (born Te Kare Papuni) (1927–2009), New Zealand poet, fiction writer and librarian

Su Shi (1037–1101), Song dynasty writer, poet and artist
Su Xiaoxiao (died c. 501 CE), courtesan and poet under Southern Qi Dynasty
Sir John Suckling (1609–1642), English poet and inventor of card game cribbage
Suleiman the Magnificent (1494–1566), Islamic poet and Ottoman ruler
Robert Sullivan (born 1967) New Zealand Māori poet, academic and editor
Jovan Sundečić (1825–1900), Serbian poet
Cemal Süreya (1931–1990), Turkish poet and writer
Abhi Subedi (born 1945), Nepalese poet, playwright and critic
Pingali Surana (16th c.), Telugu poet
Robert Sward (1933–2022), US and Canadian poet and novelist
Cole Swensen (born 1955), US poet, translator and copywriter
Karen Swenson (born 1936), US poet
May Swenson (1913–1989), US poet and playwright
Marcin Świetlicki (born 1961), Polish poet, prose writer and musician
Jonathan Swift (1667–1745), Anglo-Irish satirist, essayist and pamphleteer
Algernon Charles Swinburne (1837–1909), English poet, playwright and novelist
Anna Świrszczyńska (also Anna Swir) (1909–1984), Polish poet
Joshua Sylvester (1563–1618), English poet
Arthur William Symons (1865–1945), English poet, critic and editor
John Millington Synge (1871–1909), Irish dramatist, poet and folklore collector
Władysław Syrokomla (1823–1862), Polish poet and translator in Russian Empire
Lőrinc Szabó (1900–1957), Hungarian poet and literary translator
Fruzina Szalay (1864–1926), Hungarian poet and translator
Mikołaj Sęp Szarzyński (c. 1550 – c. 1581), poet in Polish and Latin
Arthur Sze (born 1950), Chinese US poet
Bertalan Szemere (1812–1869), Hungarian poet and politician
Gyula Szentessy (1870–1905), Hungarian poet
George Szirtes (born 1948), Hungary-born British poet and translator
Janusz Szpotański (1929–2001), Polish poet, satirist and translator
Włodzimierz Szymanowicz (1946–1967), Polish poet and painter
Wisława Szymborska (1923–2012), Polish poet, essayist and translator; 1996 Nobel Prize in Literature
Szymon Szymonowic (1558–1629), Polish poet

T

Ta–Te
Rabindranath Tagore (1861–1941), Bengali polymath; 1913 Nobel Prize in Literature
Judit Dukai Takách (Malvina, 1795–1836), Hungarian poet
Bogi Takács (born 1983), Hungarian poet and fiction writer in US
Taliesin (fl. 6th c.), British poet of post-Roman period
Meary James Thurairajah Tambimuttu (1915–1983), Tamil poet, editor and critic
Maxim Tank (1912–1996), Belarus poet
Tao Qian (365–427), Chinese poet
Jovica Tasevski-Eternijan (born 1976), Macedonian poet, essayist and literary critic
Alain Tasso (born 1962), Franco-Lebanese poet, painter and critic
Torquato Tasso (1544–1595), Italian poet
Allen Tate (1899–1979), US poet, essayist and commentator; US Poet Laureate 1943–1944
James Tate (1943–2015), US poet
Emma Tatham (1829–1855), English poet
Tracey Tawhiao (born 1967), New Zealand Maori poet and artist
Apirana Taylor (born 1955), New Zealand poet, novelist and story-teller
Edward Taylor (c. 1642–1729), colonial American poet, physician and pastor
Emily Taylor (1795–1872), English poet and children's writer
Henry Taylor (1800–1886), English poet and dramatist
Henry S. Taylor (born 1942), US poet
Jane Taylor (1783–1824), English poet and novelist
Sara Teasdale (1884–1933), US lyric poet
Guru Tegh Bahadur (1621–1675), Sikh Guru and Punjabi poet
Telesilla (fl. 510 BCE), Greek poet
Raipiyel Tennakoon (1899–1965), Sri Lankan poet
William Tennant (1784–1848), Scottish scholar and poet.
Alfred, Lord Tennyson (1809–1892), English poet; Poet Laureate of the United Kingdom 1850–1892
Vahan Terian (1885–1920), Armenian poet, lyricist and public activist
Elaine Terranova (born 1939), US poet
Lucy Terry (c. 1730–1821), African-US poet; author of oldest known work by African American
A. S. J. Tessimond (1902–1962), English poet
Neyzen Tevfik (1879–1953), Turkish poet, satirist and performer

Th–To

Kálmán Thaly (1839–1909), Hungarian poet and politician
Ernest Thayer (1863–1940), US writer and poet
John Thelwall (1764–1834), English poet and essayist
Theocritus (fl. 3rd c. BCE), Greek bucolic poet
Antony Theodore (born 1954), German pastor poet and educator
Jan Theuninck (born 1954), Belgian painter and poet
Nandi Thimmana (15th – 16th cc.), Telugu poet
Thiruvalluvar (around 31 BCE), Tamil poet and philosopher
Dylan Thomas (1914–1953), Welsh poet and writer in English
Edward Thomas (1878–1917), Welsh poet and essayist in English
Lorenzo Thomas (1944–2005), US poet and critic
R. S. Thomas (1913–2000), Welsh poet in English and Anglican priest
John Thompson (1938–1976), English-born Canadian poet
John Reuben Thompson (1823–1873), US poet, journalist, editor and publisher
Francis Thompson (1859–1907), English poet and ascetic 
James Thomson (1700–1748), Scottish poet and playwright
James Thomson (Bysshe Vanolis, 1834–1882), Scottish Victorian poet
Henry David Thoreau (1817–1862), US author, poet and philosopher
Georg Thurmair (1909–1984), German poet and hymn writer
Maria Luise Thurmair (1918–2005), German poet and hymn writer
Joseph Thurston (1704–1732), English poet
Anthony Thwaite (1930–2021), English poet and writer
Tibullus (c. 54–19 BCE), Latin poet and elegy writer
Chidiock Tichborne (1558–1586), English conspirator and poet
Thomas Tickell (1685–1740), English poet and man of letters
Ludwig Tieck (1773–1853), German poet, translator, editor and critic
Tikkana (1205–1288), Telugu poet, translator of Mahabharata
Gary Tillery (born 1947), US writer, poet and artist
Abdillahi Suldaan Mohammed Timacade (1920–1973), Somali poet
Eugeniusz Tkaczyszyn-Dycki (born 1962), Polish poet
Nick Toczek (born 1950), English writer, poet and broadcaster
Melvin B. Tolson (1898–1966), US Modernist poet, educator and columnist
Charles Tomlinson (1927–2015), English poet and translator
Jean Toomer (1894–1967), US poet and novelist
Mihály Tompa (1819–1868), Hungarian poet and pastor
Álvaro Torres-Calderón (born 1975), Peruvian poet
Kálmán Tóth (1831–1881), Hungarian poet
Krisztina Tóth (born 1967), Hungarian poet and translator
Sándor Tóth (1939–2019), Hungarian poet and journalist
Cyril Tourneur (1575–1626), English poetic dramatist
Ann Townsend (born 1962) US poet and essayist

Tr–Tz
Thomas Traherne (1636/1637–1674), English poet, clergyman and religious writer
Georg Trakl (1887–1914), Austrian Expressionist poet
Elizabeth Treadwell (born 1967), US poet
Roland Michel Tremblay (born 1972), French Canadian writer and poet
William S. Tribell (born 1977), US poet
Duško Trifunović (1933–2006), Serbian poet and writer
Calvin Trillin (born 1935), US humorist, poet and novelist
Geeta Tripathee (born 1972), Nepali poet, lyricist, essayist and scholar
Suryakant Tripathi (1896–1961), Indian poet in Hindi and Bengali
Quincy Troupe (born 1939), US poet, editor and professor
Tõnu Trubetsky (Tony Blackplait) (born 1963), Estonian glam punk musician and poet
Marina Tsvetaeva (1892–1941), Russian/Soviet poet
Kurt Tucholsky (1890–1935), German-Jewish journalist, satirist and writer
Charlotte Maria Tucker (1821–1893), English poet and religious writer
Tulsidas (1497/1532–1623), Hindu poet-saint, reformer and philosopher
Hovhannes Tumanyan (1869–1923), Armenian writer and public activist
Ğabdulla Tuqay (1886–1913), Tatar poet, critic and publisher
George Turberville (c. 1540 – c. 1597), English poet
Charles Tennyson Turner (1808–1879), English poet, elder brother of Alfred Tennyson
Julian Turner (born 1955), English poet and mental health worker
Thomas Tusser (1524–1580), English poet and farmer
Hone Tuwhare (1922–2008), New Zealand Māori poet
Julian Tuwim (1894–1953), Polish poet of Jewish descent
Jan Twardowski (1915–2006), Polish poet and priest
Chase Twichell (born 1950), US poet, professor and publisher
Pontus de Tyard (c. 1521–1605), French poet and priest
Fyodor Tyutchev (1803–1873), Russian Romantic poet
Tristan Tzara (1896–1963), Romanian and French avant-garde poet and performance artist

U
Kornel Ujejski (1823–1897) Polish poet and political writer
Erzsi Újvári (1899–1940), Hungarian poet
Laura Ulewicz (1930–2007), US beat poet
Kavisekhara Dr Umar Alisha (1885–1945), Telugu poet
Jeff Unaegbu (born 1979), Nigerian writer, actor and documentary film maker
Miguel de Unamuno (1864–1936), Spanish essayist, novelist and poet
Giuseppe Ungaretti (1888–1970), Italian poet, critic and academic
Unorthodox Australian Poet (born 1965), Australian poet
Louis Untermeyer (1885–1977), US poet, anthologist and critic; US Poet Laureate 1961–1962
John Updike (1932–2009), US novelist, poet and critic
Allen Upward (1863–1926), Irish-English Imagist poet and teacher
Amy Uyematsu (born 1947), Japanese-US poet

V
János Vajda (1827–1897), Hungarian poet and journalist
Paul Valéry (1871–1945), French Symbolist author and poet
Alfonso Vallejo (1943–2021), Spanish artist, playwright and poet
César Vallejo (1892–1938), Peruvian poet, writer and playwright
Jean-Pierre Vallotton (born 1955), French-Swiss poet and writer
Valmiki poet harbinger in Sanskrit literature
Cor Van den Heuvel (born 1931), US haiku poet, editor and archivist
Mona Van Duyn (1921–2004), US poet; US Poet Laureate 1992–1993
Lin Van Hek (born 1944), Australian poet, writer and fashion designer
Nikola Vaptsarov (1909–1942), Bulgarian poet
Varand (born 1954), Armenian poet, writer and professor of literature
Mahadevi Varma (1907–1987), Indian poet writing in Hindi
Dimitris Varos (1949–2017), modern Greek poet, journalist and photographer
Henry Vaughan (1621–1695), Welsh author, physician and metaphysical poet
Thomas Vaux, 2nd Baron Vaux of Harrowden (1509–1556), English poet
Meta Vaux Warrick Fuller (1877–1968), African-American poet, painter and sculptor
Joana Vaz (c. 1500 – after 1570), Portuguese poet and courtier
Vazha-Pshavela (aka Luka Razikashvili) (1861–1915), Georgian poet and writer
Reetika Vazirani (1962–2003), US poet and educator
Ivan Vazov (1850–1921), Bulgarian poet, novelist and playwright
Attila Végh (born 1962), Hungarian poet and philosopher
Maffeo Vegio (Latin: Maphaeus Vegius) (1407–1458), Italian poet in Latin
Vemana (aka Kumaragiri Vema Reddy), Indian Telugu poet
Gavril Stefanović Venclović (fl. 1680–1749), Serbian priest, writer, poet and illuminator
Helen Vendler (born 1933), US poetry critic and professor
Jacint Verdaguer (1845–1902), Catalan poet in Spain
Paul Verlaine (1844–1896), French poet associated with Symbolist movement
Paul Vermeersch (born 1973), Canadian poet
Veturi (1936–2010), Telugu poet and songwriter
Francis Vielé-Griffin (1864–1937), French symbolist poet
Peter Viereck (1916–2006), US poet, professor and political thinker
Gilles Vigneault (born 1928), Canadian Quebecois poet, publisher and singer-songwriter
Judit Vihar (born 1944), Hungarian poet and literary historian
Jose Garcia Villa (1908–1997), Philippines poet, literary critic and painter
Xavier Villaurrutia (1903–1950), Mexican poet and playwright
François Villon (c. 1431–1464), French poet, thief and barroom brawler
Virgil (Publius Vergilius Maro; 70–19 BCE), ancient Roman poet
Roemer Visscher (1547–1620), Dutch writer and poet
Mihály Csokonai Vitéz (1773–1805), Hungarian poet
Mihailo Vitković (1778–1829), Hungarian poet in Serbian and lawyer
Walther von der Vogelweide (c. 1170 – c. 1230), celebrated Middle High German lyric poet
Vincent Voiture (1597–1648), French poet
Voltaire (François-Marie Arouet) (1694–1778), French Enlightenment writer
Joost van den Vondel (1587–1679), Dutch playwright and poet
Andrei Voznesensky (1933–2010), Soviet Russian poet
Stanko Vraz (1810–1851), Croatian-Slovenian language poet
Vyasa, considered author of Mahabharata and some Vedas

W

Wa–Wh
Wace (c. 1110 – post-1174), Norman poet
Sidney Wade (born 1951), US poet and professor
John Wain (1925–1994), English poet, novelist and critic
Diane Wakoski (born 1937), US poet linked with deep image, confessional and Beat generation poets
Derek Walcott (1930–2017), Saint Lucia poet and playwright; 1992 Nobel Prize in Literature
Anne Waldman (born 1945), US poet
Rosmarie Waldrop (born 1935), German-US poet, translator and publisher
Arthur Waley (1889–1966), English orientalist and Sinologist, poet and translator
Alice Walker (born 1944), US author, poet and activist
Margaret Walker (1915–1998), African-US writer
Edmund Waller (1606–1687), English poet and politician
Martin Walser (born 1927), German writer
Robert Walser (1878–1956), German-speaking Swiss writer
Wan Shenzi (1856–1923), Chinese couplet writer
Connie Wanek (born 1952), US poet
Wang Wei (王維, 701–761), Tang Dynasty Chinese poet, musician and painter
Wang Wei (王微, 1597–1647), Chinese priestess and poet
Emily Warn, US poet
Sylvia Townsend Warner (1893–1978), English novelist and poet
Robert Penn Warren (1905–1989), US poet, novelist and critic
Lewis Warsh (1944–1920), US poet, writer and visual artist
Thomas Warton (1728–1790), English literary historian, critic and poet
Albert Wass (1908–1998), Hungarian poet and novelist exiled in US
Aleksander Wat (1900–1967), Polish poet and memoirist
Vernon Watkins (1906–1967), Welsh poet, translator and painter
Thomas Watson (1555–1592), English lyric poet in English and Latin
Samuel Wagan Watson (born 1972), Australian poet
George Watsky (born 1986), US poet and rapper
Barrett Watten (born 1948), US poet, editor and educator linked with Language poets
Isaac Watts (1674–1748), English hymnist and logician
Theodore Watts-Dunton (1832–1914), English critic and poet
Tom Wayman (born 1945), Canadian poet, author and educator
Adam Ważyk (1905–1982), Polish poet and essayist
Francis Webb (1925–1973), Australian poet
John Webster (c. 1580 – c. 1634), English dramatist
Rebecca Wee, US poet and professor
Hannah Weiner (1928–1997), US Language poet
Sándor Weöres (1913–1989), Hungarian poet and translator
Wei Yingwu (737–792), Chinese poet
Wen Yiduo (1899–1946), Chinese poet
Marjory Heath Wentworth (born 1958), US poet; South Carolina Poet Laureate
Charles Wesley (1707–1788), English Methodist leader and hymnist
Gilbert West (1703–1756), English poet, translator and Christian apologist
Philip Whalen (1923–2002), US poet, Zen Buddhist and figure in San Francisco Renaissance
Franz Werfel (1890–1945), Austrian-Bohemian novelist, playwright and poet
Johan Herman Wessel (1742–1785), Norwegian-Danish poet
Mary Whateley (1738–1825), English poet and playwright
Phillis Wheatley (1753–1784), first African-US poet
Billy Edd Wheeler (born 1932), US songwriter, performer and poet
E.B. White (1899–1985), US essayist, author and humorist
Henry Kirke White (1785–1806), English poet
James L. White (1936–1981), US poet, editor and teacher
Walt Whitman (1819–1892), US poet, essayist and humanist
Isabella Whitney (fl. 1567–1573), English poet
Reed Whittemore (1919–2012), US poet, biographer and critic
John Greenleaf Whittier (1807–1892), US poet

Wi–Wy
Anna Wickham (Edith Alice Mary Harper) (1884–1947), English poet raised in Australia
Les Wicks (born 1955), Australian poet, publisher and editor
Ulrika Widström (1764–1841), Swedish poet and translator
John Wieners (1934–2002), US lyric poet
Kazimierz Wierzyński (1894–1969), Polish poet and journalist
Richard Wilbur (1921–2017), US poet; US Poet Laureate 1987–1988
 Peter Wild ((1940–2009) US poet and historian
Jane Wilde (1826–1896), Irish poet and nationalist
Oscar Wilde (1854–1900), Irish writer, playwright and poet
John Wilkinson (born 1953), English poet
William IX, Duke of Aquitaine (1071–1126), earliest troubadour poet whose work survives
Aeneas Francon Williams (1886–1971), Anglo-Scottish poet, writer and missionary
Emmett Williams (1925–2007), US poet and visual artist
Jonathan Williams (1929–2008), US poet, publisher and essayist
Heathcote Williams (1941–2017), English poet, political activist and dramatist
Miller Williams (1930–2015), US poet, translator and editor
Oscar Williams (1900–1964), Jewish Ukrainian-US anthologist and poet
Saul Williams (born 1972), African-US singer, poet, writer and actor
Sherley Anne Williams (1944–1999), African-US poet, novelist and social critic
Waldo Williams (1904–1971), Welsh poet in Welsh
William Carlos Williams (1883–1963), poet and physician linked with modernism and imagism
William Williams Pantycelyn (1717–1791), Welsh poet and hymnist
Clive Wilmer (born 1945), English poet
John Wilmot, Earl of Rochester (1647–1680), English poet, courtier and satirist
Eleanor Wilner (born 1937), US poet and editor
Anne Elizabeth Wilson (1901–1946) US-born Canadian poet, writer, editor
Peter Lamborn Wilson (Hakim Bey, 1945–2022), US political and cultural writer, essayist and poet
Christian Wiman (born 1966), US poet and editor
David Wingate (1828–1892), Scottish poet
Yvor Winters (1900–1968), US poet and literary critic
George Wither (1588–1667), English poet, pamphleteer and satirist
Stanisław Ignacy Witkiewicz (Witkacy, 1885–1939), Polish poet, writer and philosopher
Stefan Witwicki (1801–1847), Polish poet
Woeser (born 1966), Tibetan activist, poet and essayist
Rafał Wojaczek (1945–1971), Polish poet
Grażyna Wojcieszko (born 1957), Polish poet and essayist
Christa Wolf (1929–2011), German literary critic, novelist and poet
Charles Wolfe (1791–1823), Irish poet
Hans Wollschläger (1935–2007), German writer, translator and historian
Sholeh Wolpe (born 1962), Iranian-US poet, literary translator and playwright
Maryla Wolska (Iwo Płomieńczyk, 1873–1930), Polish poet
George Woodcock (1912–1995), Canadian poet and writer of biography and history
Gregory Woods (born 1953), English poet who grew up in Ghana
Dorothy Wordsworth (1771–1855), English author, poet and diarist; sister of William Wordsworth
William Wordsworth (1770–1850), English Romantic poet 
Philip Stanhope Worsley (1835–1866), English poet
Carolyn D. Wright (1949–2016), US poet
Charles Wright (born 1935), US poet; 1998 Pulitzer Prize for Poetry 
David Wright (1920–1994), South African-born poet and author
Franz Wright (1953–2015), US poet, son of James Wright; 2004 Pulitzer Prize for Poetry
James Wright (1927–1980), US poet, father of Franz Wright
Jay Wright (born 1935), African-US poet, playwright and essayist
Judith Wright (1915–2000), Australian poet and environmentalist
Lady Mary Wroth (1587 – c. 1651), English poet
Thomas Wyatt (1503–1542), English ambassador and lyric poet
Józef Wybicki (1747–1822), Polish poet and national-anthem writer
Elinor Wylie (1885–1928), US poet and novelist
Hedd Wyn (1887–1917), Welsh poet in Welsh
Edward Alexander Wyon (1842−1872), English architect and poet
Stanisław Wyspiański (1869–1907), Polish poet, playwright and painter

X
Xenokleides (4th c. BCE), Athenian poet
Xin Qiji (1140–1207), Chinese poet
Cali Xuseen Xirsi (also Yam Yam) (1946–2005), Somali poet active in 1960s
Xu Zhimo (1897–1931), Chinese poet
Halima Xudoyberdiyeva (1947–2018), Uzbek poet

Y
Jūkichi Yagi (1898–1927), Japanese religious poet
Leo Yankevich (born 1961), US poet and editor
Peyo Yavorov (1878–1914), Bulgarian Symbolist poet
Raushan Yazdani (1918–1967), Bengali poet and researcher 
W. B. Yeats (1865–1939), Irish poet; 1923 Nobel Prize in Literature
Sergei Yesenin (1895–1925), Russian lyrical poet
Yevgeny Yevtushenko (1933–2017), Soviet Russian poet, dramatist and film director
Yi Suhyeong (1435–1528), politician and Confucian scholar, writer, and poet 
Lin Yining (1655 – c. 1730), Chinese poet, painter and composer
Akiko Yosano (1878–1942), Japanese poet, feminist and pacifist
Nima Yooshij (1895–1960), Iranian poet
Andrew Young (1885–1971), Scottish poet and clergyman
Edward Young (1681–1765), English poet
Ian Young (born 1945), English/Canadian poet
Kevin Young (born 1970), US poet and teacher
Marguerite Young (1908–1995), US author of poetry, fiction and non-fiction
Simpson Charles Younger (1850–1943),  baseball player, soldier during the American Civil War, Civil Rights campaigner, and poet
A. W. Yrjänä (Aki Ville Yrjänä; born 1967), Finnish poet, musician and songwriter
Yuan Mei (1716–1797), Chinese poet, scholar and gastronome

Z
Tymon Zaborowski (1799–1828), Polish poet
Adam Zagajewski (1945–2021), Polish poet, novelist and essayist
Józef Bohdan Zaleski (1802–1886), Polish poet
Wacław Michał Zaleski (1799–1849), Polish poet, critic and politician
Andrea Zanzotto (1921–2011), Italian poet
Matthew Zapruder (born 1967), US poet, translator and professor
Marya Zaturenska (1902–1982), US lyric poet
Kazimiera Zawistowska (1870–1902), Polish poet and translator
Abd al-Wahhab Abu Zayd (living), Saudi poet and translator
Piotr Zbylitowski (1569–1649), Polish poet and courtier
Katarzyna Ewa Zdanowicz-Cyganiak (born 1979), Polish poet and journalist
Emil Zegadłowicz (1888–1941), Polish poet, playwright and translator
Ludwig Zeller (1927–2019) Chilean poet
Robert Zend (1929–1985), Hungarian-Canadian poet, fiction writer and artist
Benjamin Zephaniah (born 1958), English writer, dub poet and Rastafarian
Hristofor Zhefarovich (c. 1690–1753), Serbian painter, writer and poet
Calvin Ziegler (1854–1930), German-US poet in Pennsylvania Dutch
Narcyza Żmichowska (Gabryella, 1819–1876), Polish poet and novelist
Radovan Zogović (1907–1986), Serbian/Montenegrin poet
Miklós Zrínyi (1620–1664), Hungarian poet and statesman
Zuhayr ibn Abī Sūlmā (520–609), pre-Islamic Arabian poet
Louis Zukofsky (1904–1978), US objectivist poets
Jerzy Żuławski (1874–1915), Polish poet, novelist and philosopher
Juliusz Żuławski (1910–1999), Polish poet, critic and translator
Huldrych Zwingli (1484–1531), Swish poet, hymnist and Reformation leader
Eugeniusz Żytomirski (1911–1975), Polish poet, playwright and novelist in Russia and Canada

References

 

de:Liste von Dichtern